= 2013 3 Hours of Zhuhai =

The Track map of Zhuhai International Circuit

The 2013 3 Hours of Zhuhai was the third round of the 2013 Asian Le Mans Series season. It took place on October 13, 2013, at the Zhuhai International Circuit in Zhuhai, China.

== Race result ==
Race result is as follows. Class winners in bold.

Pos	Class	No	Team	Drivers	Chassis	Tyre	Laps
Pos	Class	No	Team	Drivers	Engine	Tyre	Laps
1	**LMP2**	**24**	**(France) OAK Racing**	**(China) Ho-Pin Tung (United States) David Cheng (Hong Kong) Shaun Thong**	**Morgan LMP2**	MI	**114**
1	**LMP2**	**24**	**(France) OAK Racing**	**(China) Ho-Pin Tung (United States) David Cheng (Hong Kong) Shaun Thong**	**Judd HK 3.6 L V8**	MI	**114**
2	LMP2	18	(Hong Kong) KCMG	(Republic of Ireland) Gary Thompson (Australia) Jordan Oon (United Kingdom) James Winslow	Oreca 03	MI	114
2	LMP2	18	(Hong Kong) KCMG	(Republic of Ireland) Gary Thompson (Australia) Jordan Oon (United Kingdom) James Winslow	Nissan VK45DE 4.5 L V8	MI	114
3	**GTC**	**77**	**(Italy) AF Corse**	**(Italy) Andrea Bertolini (Italy) Michele Rugolo (Australia) Steve Wyatt**	**Ferrari 458 Italia GT3**	MI	**110**
3	**GTC**	**77**	**(Italy) AF Corse**	**(Italy) Andrea Bertolini (Italy) Michele Rugolo (Australia) Steve Wyatt**	**Ferrari F142 4.5 L V8**	MI	**110**
4	**LMGTE**	**70**	**(Japan) Team Taisan Ken Endless**	**(Japan) Akira Iida (Japan) Shogo Mitsuyama (Japan) Naoki Yokomizo**	**Ferrari 458 Italia GT2**	MI	**108**
4	**LMGTE**	**70**	**(Japan) Team Taisan Ken Endless**	**(Japan) Akira Iida (Japan) Shogo Mitsuyama (Japan) Naoki Yokomizo**	**Ferrari F142 4.5 L V8**	MI	**108**
5	GTC	91	(Taiwan) Team AAI Rstrada	(Taiwan) Jun San Chen (Japan) Takeshi Tsuchiya (Japan) Tatsuya Tanigawa	McLaren MP4-12C GT3	MI	107
5	GTC	91	(Taiwan) Team AAI Rstrada	(Taiwan) Jun San Chen (Japan) Takeshi Tsuchiya (Japan) Tatsuya Tanigawa	McLaren 3.8 L Turbo V8	MI	107
6	GTC	007	(Hong Kong) Craft Racing	(Hong Kong) Darryl O'Young (Japan) Keita Sawa (Hong Kong) Frank Yu	Ford GT GT3	MI	107
6	GTC	007	(Hong Kong) Craft Racing	(Hong Kong) Darryl O'Young (Japan) Keita Sawa (Hong Kong) Frank Yu	Ford 5.0 L V8	MI	107
7	GTC	37	(China) BBT Racing	(China) Anthony Liu (Italy) Davide Rizzo (Italy) Massimilliano Wiser	Lamborghini Gallardo FLII GT3	MI	107
7	GTC	37	(China) BBT Racing	(China) Anthony Liu (Italy) Davide Rizzo (Italy) Massimilliano Wiser	Lamborghini 5.2 L V10	MI	107
8	GTC	92	(Taiwan) Team AAI Rstrada	(Taiwan) Morris Chen (Germany) Marco Seefried (Japan) Yasushi Kikuchi	McLaren MP4-12C GT3	MI	106
8	GTC	92	(Taiwan) Team AAI Rstrada	(Taiwan) Morris Chen (Germany) Marco Seefried (Japan) Yasushi Kikuchi	McLaren 3.8 L Turbo V8	MI	106

Asian Le Mans Series
Previous race: 3 Hours of Fuji	2013 season	Next race: 3 Hours of Sepang
