= 2013 3 Hours of Inje =

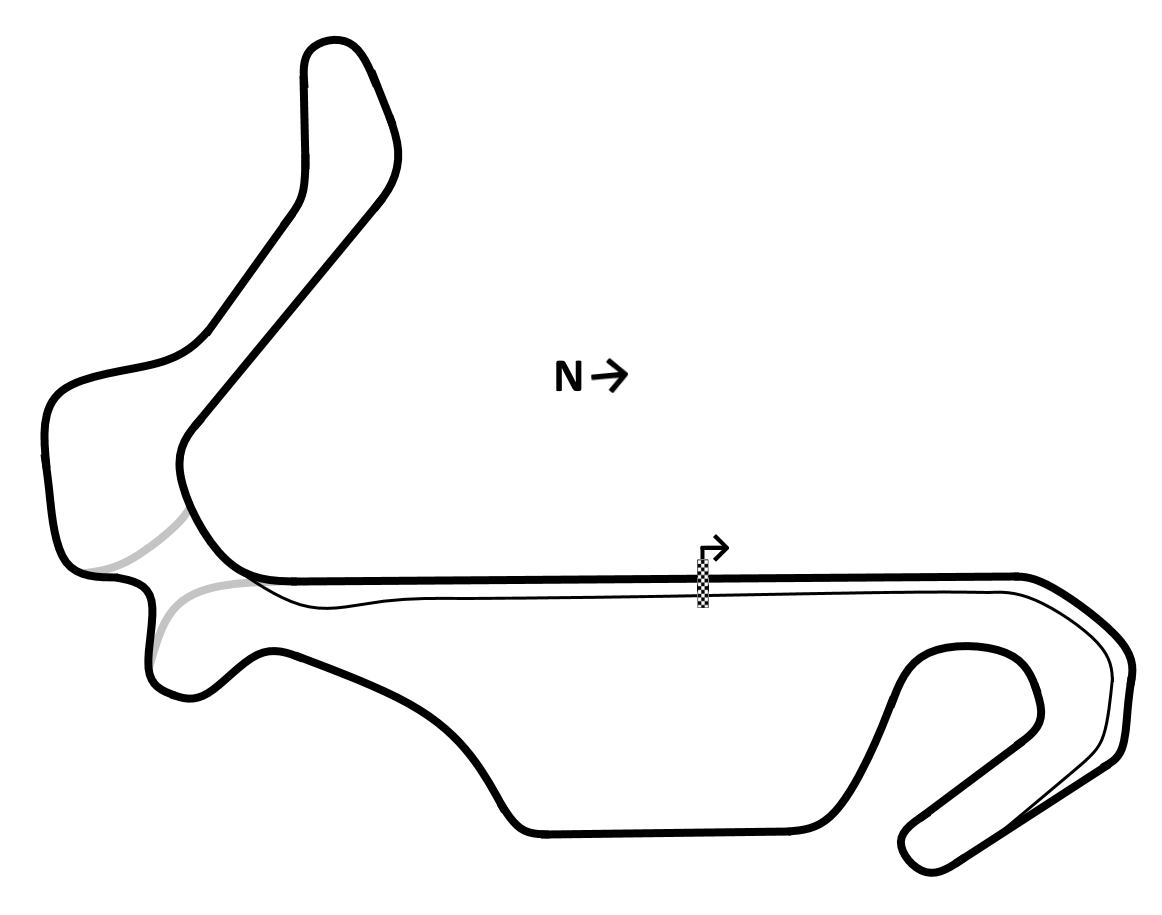
Track map of the Inje Speedium

The 2013 3 Hours of Inje was the first round of the 2013 Asian Le Mans Series season and the first Asian Le Mans Series race since the 2009 1000 km of Okayama. It took place on August 4, 2013, at the Inje Speedium in Inje County, South Korea.

== Race result ==
Race result is as follows. Class winners in bold.

Pos	Class	No	Team	Drivers	Chassis	Tyre	Laps
Pos	Class	No	Team	Drivers	Engine	Tyre	Laps
1	**LMP2**	**18**	**(Hong Kong) KCMG**	**(Malaysia) Akash Nandy (Republic of Ireland) Gary Thompson (United Kingdom) James Winslow**	**Morgan LMP2**	MI	**106**
1	**LMP2**	**18**	**(Hong Kong) KCMG**	**(Malaysia) Akash Nandy (Republic of Ireland) Gary Thompson (United Kingdom) James Winslow**	**Nissan VK45DE 4.5 L V8**	MI	**106**
2	**GTC**	**77**	**(Italy) AF Corse**	**(Italy) Andrea Bertolini (Italy) Michele Rugolo (Australia) Steve Wyatt**	**Ferrari 458 Italia GT3**	MI	**101**
2	**GTC**	**77**	**(Italy) AF Corse**	**(Italy) Andrea Bertolini (Italy) Michele Rugolo (Australia) Steve Wyatt**	**Ferrari F142 4.5 L V8**	MI	**101**
3	LMP2	24	(France) OAK Racing	(United States) David Cheng (Taiwan) Jeffrey Lee (China) Ho-Pin Tung	Morgan LMP2	MI	101
3	LMP2	24	(France) OAK Racing	(United States) David Cheng (Taiwan) Jeffrey Lee (China) Ho-Pin Tung	Judd HK 3.6 L V8	MI	101
4	**LMGTE**	**70**	**(Japan) Taisan Ken Endless**	**(Japan) Kamui Kobayashi (Japan) Naoki Yokomizo**	**Ferrari 458 Italia GT2**	MI	**99**
4	**LMGTE**	**70**	**(Japan) Taisan Ken Endless**	**(Japan) Kamui Kobayashi (Japan) Naoki Yokomizo**	**Ferrari F142 4.5 L V8**	MI	**99**
5	GTC	26	(Japan) Taisan Ken Endless	(Japan) Kyosuke Mineo (Japan) Yukinori Taniguchi	Porsche 996 GT3-RS GT300	MI	96
5	GTC	26	(Japan) Taisan Ken Endless	(Japan) Kyosuke Mineo (Japan) Yukinori Taniguchi	Porsche 3.6 L Flat-6	MI	96
6	GTC	37	(China) BBT Racing	(China) Anthony Liu (Italy) Davide Rizzo (Italy) Massimilliano Wiser	Lamborghini Gallardo FLII GT3	MI	95
6	GTC	37	(China) BBT Racing	(China) Anthony Liu (Italy) Davide Rizzo (Italy) Massimilliano Wiser	Lamborghini 5.2 L V10	MI	95
7	GTC	91	(Taiwan) Team AAI Rstrada	(Japan) Akira Iida (Taiwan) Jun San Chen	McLaren MP4-12C GT3	MI	93
7	GTC	91	(Taiwan) Team AAI Rstrada	(Japan) Akira Iida (Taiwan) Jun San Chen	McLaren 3.8 L Turbo V8	MI	93
DNF	GTC	007	(Hong Kong) Craft Racing AMR	(Germany) Stefan Mücke (Japan) Keita Sawa (Hong Kong) Frank Yu	Aston Martin V12 Vantage GT3	MI	90
DNF	GTC	007	(Hong Kong) Craft Racing AMR	(Germany) Stefan Mücke (Japan) Keita Sawa (Hong Kong) Frank Yu	Aston Martin 6.0 L V12	MI	90
DNS	GTC	92	(Taiwan) Team AAI Rstrada	(Japan) Akihiro Asai (Taiwan) Morris Chen (Thailand) Somchai Saksirivatekul	McLaren MP4-12C GT3	MI	0
DNS	GTC	92	(Taiwan) Team AAI Rstrada	(Japan) Akihiro Asai (Taiwan) Morris Chen (Thailand) Somchai Saksirivatekul	McLaren 3.8 L Turbo V8	MI	0

Asian Le Mans Series
Previous race: None	2013 season	Next race: 3 Hours of Fuji
