= 2013 3 Hours of Sepang =

Layout of the Sepang International Circuit

The 2013 3 Hours of Sepang was the fourth and final round of the 2013 Asian Le Mans Series season. It took place on December 8, 2013 at the Sepang International Circuit in Selangor, Malaysia.

== Race result ==
Race result is as follows. Class winners in bold.

Pos	Class	No	Team	Drivers	Chassis	Tyre	Laps
Pos	Class	No	Team	Drivers	Engine	Tyre	Laps
1	**LMP2**	**24**	**(France) OAK Racing**	**(China) Ho-Pin Tung (United States) David Cheng**	**Morgan LMP2**	MI	**86**
1	**LMP2**	**24**	**(France) OAK Racing**	**(China) Ho-Pin Tung (United States) David Cheng**	**Judd HK 3.6 L V8**	MI	**86**
2	LMP2	18	(Hong Kong) KCMG	(Japan) Tsugio Matsuda (United Kingdom) James Winslow	Morgan LMP2	MI	86
2	LMP2	18	(Hong Kong) KCMG	(Japan) Tsugio Matsuda (United Kingdom) James Winslow	Nissan VK45DE 4.5 L V8	MI	86
3	LMP2	27	(Hong Kong) Craft Racing	(United Kingdom) Richard Bradley (Republic of Ireland) Dan Polley (China) Kevin Pu Junjin	Oreca 03	MI	86
3	LMP2	27	(Hong Kong) Craft Racing	(United Kingdom) Richard Bradley (Republic of Ireland) Dan Polley (China) Kevin Pu Junjin	Nissan VK45DE 4.5 L V8	MI	86
4	**GTC**	**33**	**(Singapore) Clearwater Racing**	**(Singapore) Weng Sun Mok (Finland) Toni Vilander**	**Ferrari 458 Italia GT3**	MI	**82**
4	**GTC**	**33**	**(Singapore) Clearwater Racing**	**(Singapore) Weng Sun Mok (Finland) Toni Vilander**	**Ferrari F142 4.5 L V8**	MI	**82**
5	GTC	77	(Italy) AF Corse	(Italy) Andrea Bertolini (Italy) Michele Rugolo (Australia) Steve Wyatt	Ferrari 458 Italia GT3	MI	82
5	GTC	77	(Italy) AF Corse	(Italy) Andrea Bertolini (Italy) Michele Rugolo (Australia) Steve Wyatt	Ferrari F142 4.5 L V8	MI	82
6	GTC	007	(Hong Kong) Craft Racing	(Germany) Stefan Mücke (Japan) Keita Sawa	Aston Martin V12 Vantage GT3	MI	82
6	GTC	007	(Hong Kong) Craft Racing	(Germany) Stefan Mücke (Japan) Keita Sawa	Aston Martin 6.0 L V12	MI	82
7	GTC	37	(China) BBT Racing	(Italy) Fabio Babini (China) Anthony Liu (Italy) Davide Rizzo	Lamborghini Gallardo FLII GT3	MI	81
7	GTC	37	(China) BBT Racing	(Italy) Fabio Babini (China) Anthony Liu (Italy) Davide Rizzo	Lamborghini 5.2 L V10	MI	81
8	GTC	009	(Hong Kong) Craft Racing	(Japan) Tomonobu Fujii (Hong Kong) Darryl O'Young (Hong Kong) Frank Yu	Aston Martin V12 Vantage GT3	MI	81
8	GTC	009	(Hong Kong) Craft Racing	(Japan) Tomonobu Fujii (Hong Kong) Darryl O'Young (Hong Kong) Frank Yu	Aston Martin 6.0 L V12	MI	81
9	**LMGTE**	**70**	**(Japan) Team Taisan Ken Endless**	**(Japan) Akira Iida (Japan) Shogo Mitsuyama (Japan) Naoki Yokomizo**	**Ferrari 458 Italia GT2**	MI	**80**
9	**LMGTE**	**70**	**(Japan) Team Taisan Ken Endless**	**(Japan) Akira Iida (Japan) Shogo Mitsuyama (Japan) Naoki Yokomizo**	**Ferrari F142 4.5 L V8**	MI	**80**
10	GTC	91	(Taiwan) Team AAI Rstrada	(Taiwan) Jun San Chen (Japan) Takeshi Tsuchiya (Japan) Tatsuya Tanigawa	BMW Z4 GT3	MI	80
10	GTC	91	(Taiwan) Team AAI Rstrada	(Taiwan) Jun San Chen (Japan) Takeshi Tsuchiya (Japan) Tatsuya Tanigawa	BMW 4.4 L V8	MI	80
11	LMGTE	35	(Taiwan) Team AAI Rstrada	(Taiwan) Morris Chen (Germany) Marco Seefried (Japan) Ryohei Sakaguchi	Porsche 997 GT3-RSR	MI	74
11	LMGTE	35	(Taiwan) Team AAI Rstrada	(Taiwan) Morris Chen (Germany) Marco Seefried (Japan) Ryohei Sakaguchi	Porsche 4.0 L Flat-6	MI	74
12	**GTC Am**	**69**	**(Malaysia) Team Primemantle Aylezo**	**(Malaysia) Zen Low (Sri Lanka) Dilantha Malagamuwa (Italy) Giorgio Sanna**	**Lamborghini Gallardo**	MI	**72**
12	**GTC Am**	**69**	**(Malaysia) Team Primemantle Aylezo**	**(Malaysia) Zen Low (Sri Lanka) Dilantha Malagamuwa (Italy) Giorgio Sanna**	**Lamborghini 5.2 L V10**	MI	**72**
13	GTC Am	96	(Malaysia) Mike Racing	(Malaysia) Rick Cheang Wan Chin (Malaysia) Michael Chua Khian Keng (Malaysia) Joseph Chua Thian Song	Lamborghini Gallardo	MI	71
13	GTC Am	96	(Malaysia) Mike Racing	(Malaysia) Rick Cheang Wan Chin (Malaysia) Michael Chua Khian Keng (Malaysia) Joseph Chua Thian Song	Lamborghini 5.2 L V10	MI	71
Ret	GTC Am	36	(Taiwan) Gama Racing	(Taiwan) Michael Huang (Taiwan) Han Lin (Taiwan) Hanss Lin	Lamborghini Gallardo	MI	14
Ret	GTC Am	36	(Taiwan) Gama Racing	(Taiwan) Michael Huang (Taiwan) Han Lin (Taiwan) Hanss Lin	Lamborghini 5.2 L V10	MI	14

Asian Le Mans Series
Previous race: 3 Hours of Zhuhai	2013 season	Next race: none
