= Marco Seefried =

German racing driver (born 1976)

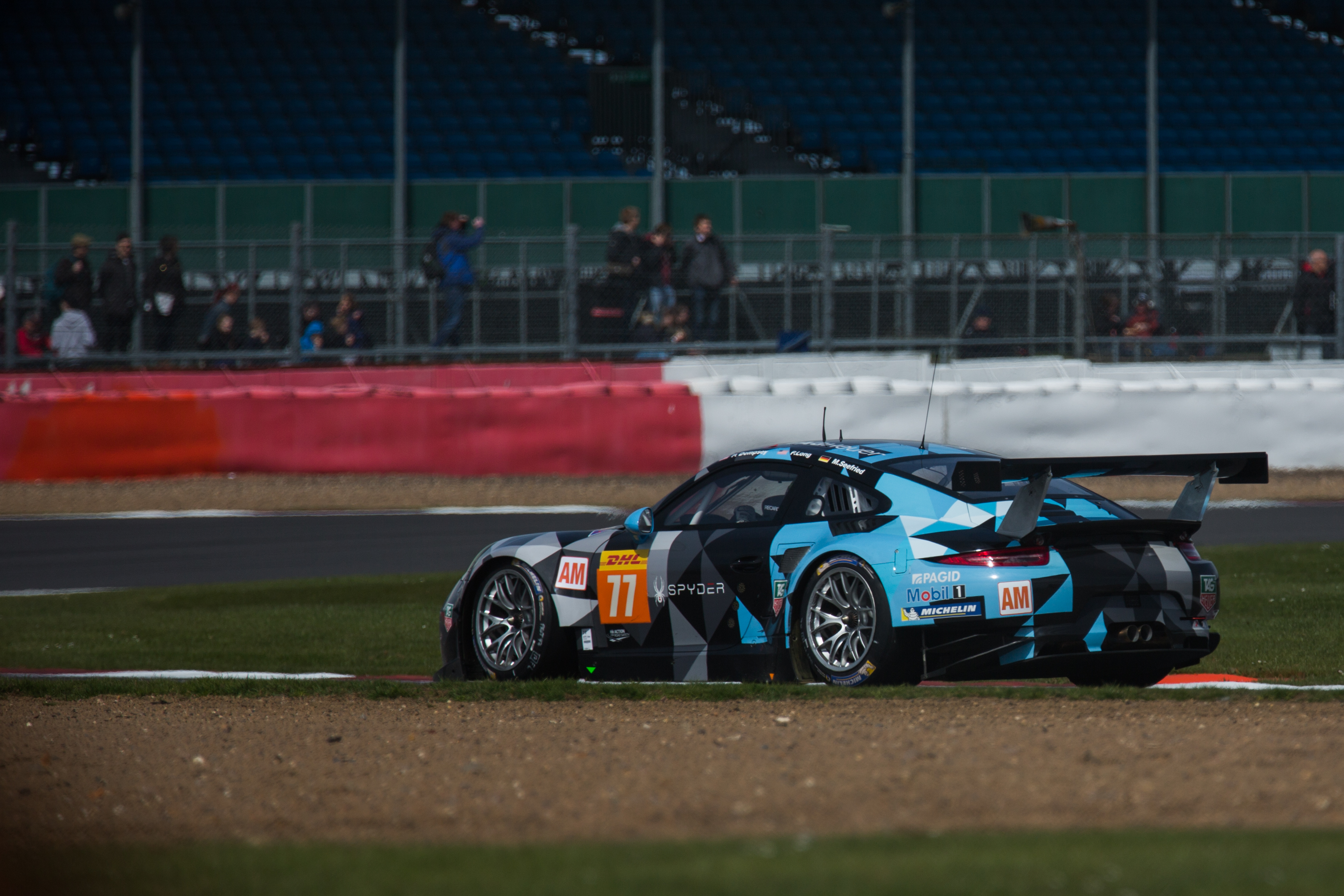
- Seefried at the 2015 6 Hours of Silverstone
- Nationality: (Germany) German
- Born: 17 February 1976 (age 50) Oettingen, West Germany (now Germany)
- Categorisation: FIA Silver (until 2016, 2019–); FIA Gold (2017–2018)

Marco Seefried (born 17 February 1976 in Oettingen) is a German racing driver.

Seefried is a long-term Porsche contracted driver, an FIA World Endurance Championship race winner in LMGTE Am for Proton Competition, and a class winner at the 24 Hours of Daytona, 12 Hours of Sebring and Nürburgring 24 Hours. He has also won overall in the Blancpain GT Series for Rinaldi Racing and Emil Frey.

== Career ==
Having raced sporadically until 2002, Seefried spent two years in Porsche Supercup with Team Kadach, scoring a best result of sixth at Monaco in 2003. Part-time campaigns in Porsche Carrera Cup Germany followed, before Seefried stepped up to GT2 competition with Farnbacher Racing, picking up two best finishes of fourth in the 2006 Le Mans Series.

Seefried later switched his focus to Nürburgring-based racing, culminating in two Nürburgring 24 Hours class wins in 2010 and 2011 for Hankook Team Farnbacher, the former of which an overall podium. Also in 2011, Seefried scored Ferrari's first ever VLN Series win and expanded his horizons into other series, namely ADAC GT Masters and International GT Open, with moderate success. He pivoted back to Porsche machinery for all his programmes in 2012, finishing second in the SP7 class of the Nürburgring 24 Hours for Timbuli Racing and making his 24 Hours of Daytona debut for Mühlner Motorsport.

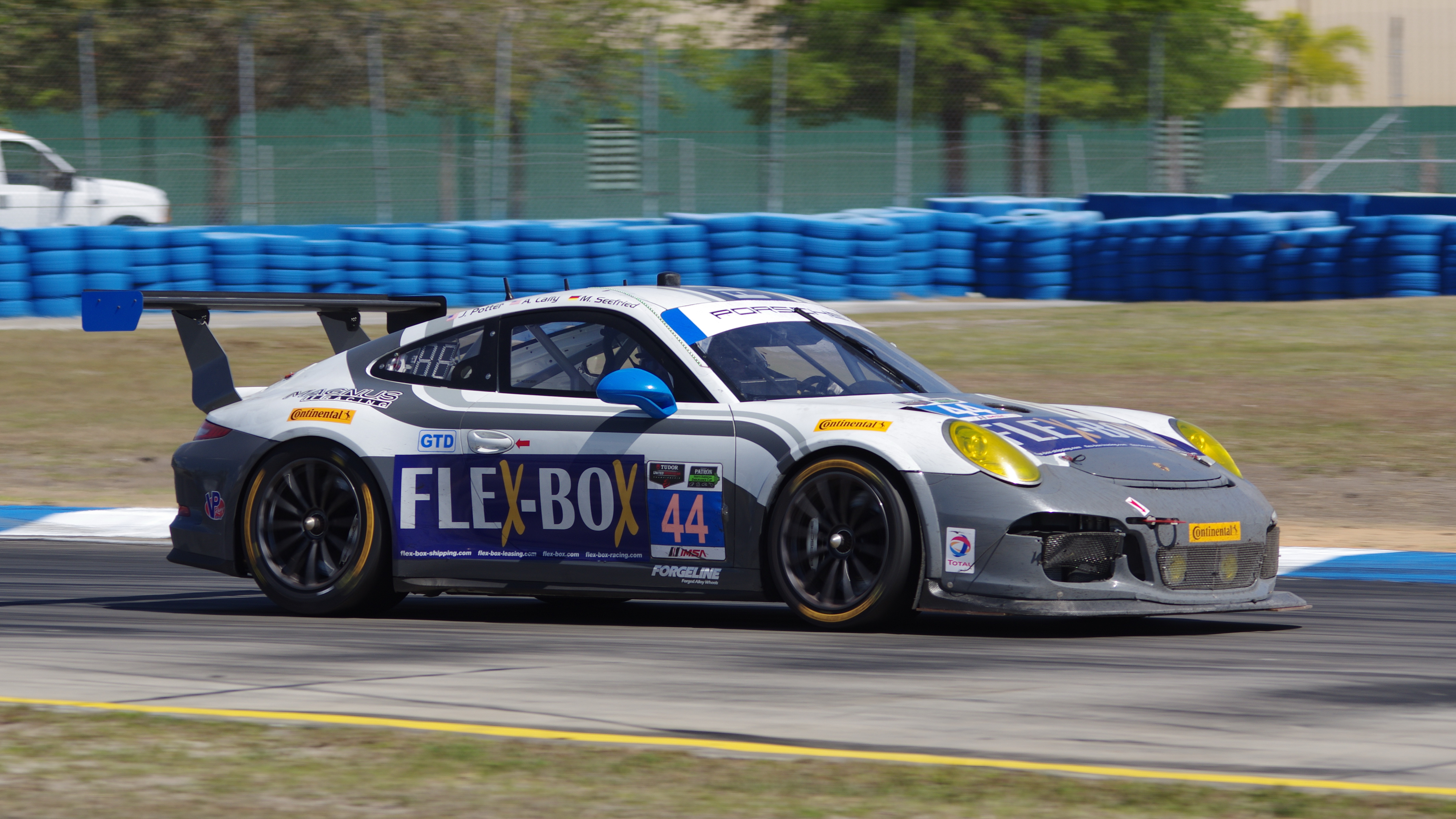
Seefried was a class winner at Sebring in 2014 in a Magnus Racing Porsche.

Seefried began making headlines internationally in 2013, as he achieved a GTC podium on his Sebring 12 Hours debut and took the Asian Le Mans Series by storm with AAI-Rstrada. His breakthrough came in 2014, with a GTD class win at Sebring for Magnus Racing backed up by further podiums at Daytona and Petit Le Mans. He paired this with a maiden season in the Blancpain Endurance Series and a return to Asia that yielded a win at Inje and a vice-championship. He had mixed fortune in Europe, notably topping the warmup at the 24 Hours of Spa in a Rinaldi Racing Ferrari, before moving to AF Corse for his home round at the Nürburgring and qualifying third overall, first in Pro-Am.

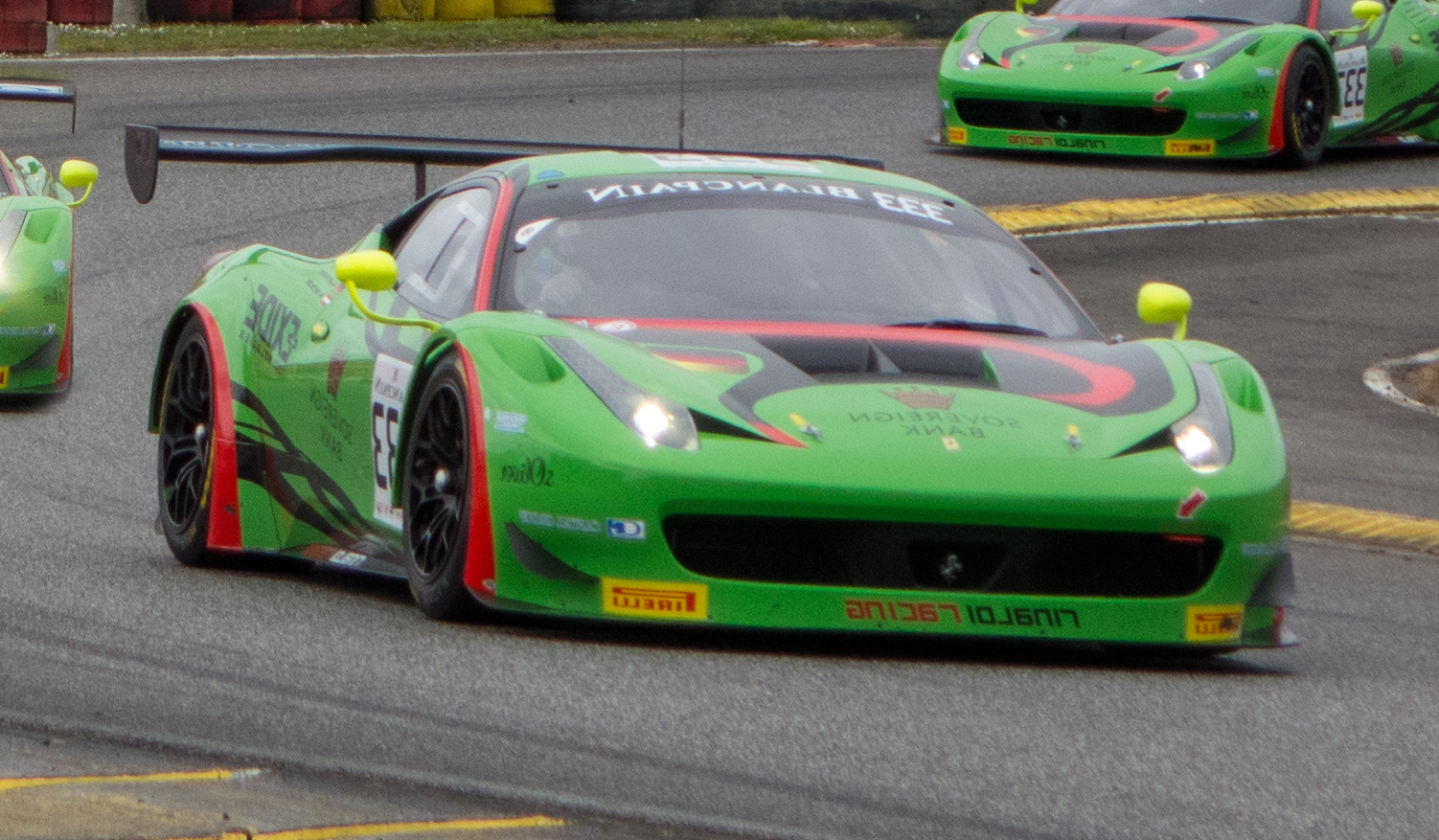
Chronophotography of Seefried in his Rinaldi Racing Ferrari at Nogaro in 2015.

Jumping back and forth between the Ferrari 458, the Porsche 911 RSR and even getting a taste of the Bentley at the N24, Seefried enjoyed a fruitful 2015. He finished fifth in both the Blancpain Sprint Series, for Rinaldi, and the FIA World Endurance Championship's GTE Am category, for Patrick Dempsey's Proton-run team. A highlight of the former was a clean sweep at Misano alongside Norbert Siedler, while the latter included a podium on debut at the 24 Hours of Le Mans and a win at Fuji. Seefried also returned to Magnus Racing for three rounds of the United SportsCar Championship's North American Endurance Cup, underlined by a podium on his final outing at Watkins Glen.

In 2016, Seefried won the 24 Hours of Daytona in GTD and scored a podium at Sebring aboard Magnus Racing's new Audi R8 LMS. He tried out the Mercedes-AMG GT3 for the first time at the Nürburgring 24 Hours, and finished second overall for HTP Motorsport as the brand locked out the top four. Elsewhere, a full-time return to the European Le Mans Series with Proton produced no podiums.

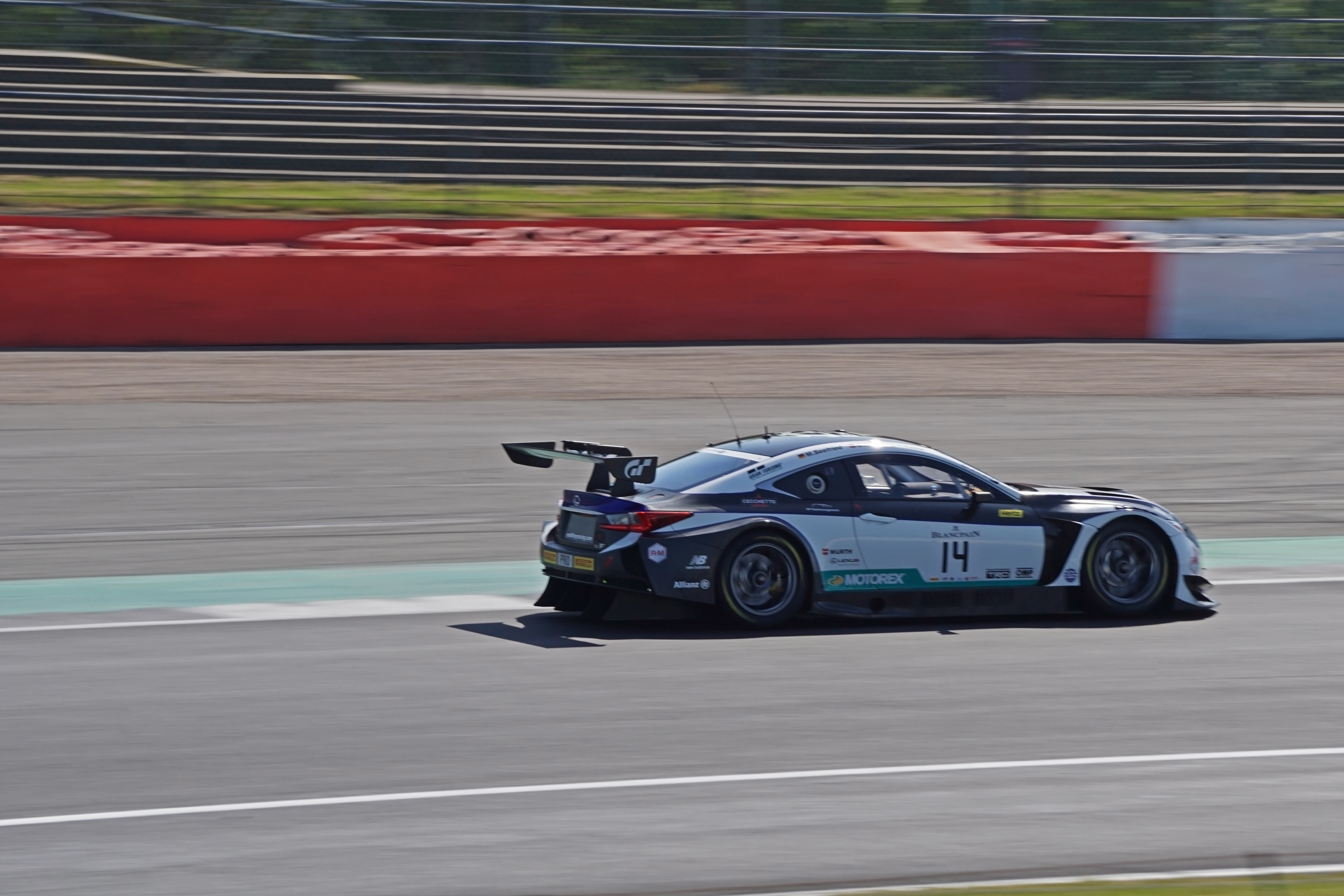
Seefried at the wheel of his Emil Frey Lexus at Silverstone in 2018.

Having been upgraded to an FIA Gold Categorisation ahead of 2017, Seefried had a reduced programme, racing primarily a Jaguar for Emil Frey Racing in the Blancpain GT Series Endurance Cup, a BMW for Falken at the N24, and an Audi for Magnus Racing in SprintX GT. He managed just one point in the former and a lone class podium in the latter. Emil Frey's switch to the Lexus RC F GT3 gave rise to a much-improved 2018 for Seefried, as he secured his first ever overall Endurance Cup win at Circuit Paul Ricard, together with Christian Klien and Albert Costa.

Despite being reclassed as FIA Silver for 2019, Seefried endured an itinerant campaign, with select appearances in IMSA, ELMS, ADAC GT Masters and Blancpain for various Porsche teams. He also entered Petit Le Mans in a Paul Miller Racing Lamborghini, and fetched a podium from a GT World Challenge Asia cameo in a HubAuto Corsa Ferrari. The COVID-marred 2020 season curtailed Seefried to only two race meetings, one of which was a dominant 24 Hours of Portimão win. He bounced back in 2021, joining Herberth Motorsport for a full 24H Series effort and an SP9 Pro-Am class win at the rain-affected Nürburgring 24 Hours, and tackling the WEC again for Dempsey-Proton Racing.

After a prolific Asian Le Mans Series return in early 2022, Seefried scaled back his racing activities again, notably reinforcing Falken at the 2022 24 Hours of Nürburgring for an eighth-place finish and Pure Rxcing at the 2023 24 Hours of Spa for a class podium. In 2024, Seefried raced at the 24 Hours of Nürburgring for Dinamic GT. Two years later, Seefried returned to the Nürburgring Langstrecken-Serie to race on a part-time basis with Hankook Competition in SP9 Pro-Am.

== Racing record ==
=== Racing career summary ===
Season	Series	Team	Races	Wins	Poles	F/Laps	Podiums	Points	Position
1993	Formula König								
1994	Formula König	Kern Motorsport		0	0	0	1	97	6th
1998	DMSB Formel Renault Cup			0	0	0		41	25th
2001	Clio V6 Trophy Germany		8	0	0	0	1	94	9th
2002	Porsche Supercup	Kadach Tuning + Service	12	0	0	0	0	57	12th
2003	Porsche Supercup	Aqua Nova Racing Team Kadach	6	0	0	0	0	27	NC
2004	Porsche Carrera Cup Germany	JvG Racing; MRS PC-Service Team	4	0	0	0	0	0	NC
2005	Porsche Carrera Cup Germany	Farnbacher Racing	3	0	0	0	0	0	NC
2006	Le Mans Series – GT2	Farnbacher Racing	5	0	0	0	0	10	11th
2007	FIA GT3 European Championship	Kessel Racing	2	0	0	0	0	0	NC
2008	Porsche Endurance Sports Cup – Class 5c		1	1	0	0	1	22.6	14th
2008	24 Hours of Nürburgring – SP7	Wolfgang Destree	1	0	0	0	0	N/A	DNF
2009	24 Hours of Nürburgring – SP7		1	0	0	0	0	N/A	DNF
2010	24H Series – A6	Jetalliance Racing	1	0	0	0	0	0	DNF
2010	Silverstone Britcar 24-Hour	Jetalliance Racing	1	0	0	0	1	N/A	**2nd**
2010	24 Hours of Spa – GTN	Jetalliance Racing	1	0	0	0	0	N/A	4th
2010	ADAC GT Masters	Dietmar Haggenmüller	2	0	0	0	0	0	NC
2010	Le Mans Series – GT2	Team Felbermayr-Proton	1	0	0	0	0	4	22nd
2010	24 Hours of Nürburgring	Hankook Team Farnbacher	1	0	0	0	1	N/A	**2nd**
2011	Ferrari Challenge Europe – Trofeo Pirelli		??	??	??	??	??	16	12th
2011	International GT Open – Pro-Am	Raceteam Deboeuf	8	0	0	2	3	21	14th
2011	24 Hours of Nürburgring – SP8	Hankook Team Farnbacher	1	1	0	0	1	N/A	**1st**
2011	ADAC GT Masters	Farnbacher ESET Racing	2	0	0	0	0	4	40th
2012	Rolex Sports Car Series – GT	Mühlner Motorsports America	1	0	0	0	0	16	68th
2012	ADAC GT Masters	Team GT3 Kasko	14	0	0	0	0	0	NC
2012	24 Hours of Nürburgring – SP7	Timbuli Racing	1	0	0	0	1	N/A	**2nd**
2012	24 Hours of Nürburgring – SP9	Timbuli Racing	1	0	0	0	0	N/A	11th
2012	International GT Open – Pro-Am	Raceteam Deboeuf	2	0	1	1	2	16	17th
2012	Aston Martin Le Mans Festival – GT1	Deboeuf Racing	1	1	0	1	1	N/A	**1st**
2013	Asian Le Mans Series – GTC	AAI-Rstrada	2	0	0	0	0	20	10th
2013	Asian Le Mans Series – LMGTE	AAI-Rstrada	1	0	0	0	1	18	**3rd**
2013	American Le Mans Series – GTC	NGT Motorsport	1	0	0	0	1	20	58th
2013	ADAC GT Masters	Farnbacher Racing	2	0	0	0	0	0	NC
2013	VLN Series – SP9 Pro-Am	Timbuli Racing	6	0	1	0	1	0	NC
2013	24 Hours of Nürburgring – SP9 Pro-Am	Timbuli Racing	1	0	0	0	0	N/A	DNF
2013	V de V Michelin Endurance Series – Challenge Endurance GT/Tourisme V de V	Rinaldi Racing	1	0	0	0	1	N/A	NC
2013	International GT Open – GTS	Rinaldi Racing	9	0	0	0	0	0	NC
2014	Dubai 24 Hour – A6-Pro	GT Corse	1	0	0	0	0	N/A	4th
2014	United SportsCar Championship – GT Daytona	Snow Racing	1	0	0	0	1	98	29th
2014	United SportsCar Championship – GT Daytona	Magnus Racing	2	1	0	0	2	98	29th
2014	Asian Le Mans Series – GT	AAI-Rstrada	4	1	1	1	3	70	**2nd**
2014	Blancpain Endurance Series – Pro-Am	GT Corse by Rinaldi	4	0	0	0	0	4	25th
2014	Blancpain Endurance Series – Pro-Am	AF Corse	1	0	1	0	0	4	25th
2014	VLN Series – SP9	Manthey Racing; GT Corse by Rinaldi	4	0	0	0	1	38.61	6th
2014	24 Hours of Nürburgring – SP9	Prosperia C. Abt Racing	1	0	0	0	0	N/A	NC
2015	United SportsCar Championship – GT	Magnus Racing	3	0	0	0	1	77	20th
2015	French GT Championship	Rinaldi Racing	1	0	0	0	0	0	NC
2015	VLN Series – SP7	Rinaldi Racing	3	0	0	0	1	0	NC
2015	Blancpain Endurance Series – Pro	Rinaldi Racing	2	0	0	0	0	6	24th
2015	Blancpain Endurance Series – Pro-Am	Rinaldi Racing	1	0	0	0	0	6	25th
2015	GT Sprint Series	Rinaldi Racing	12	2	1	0	6	97	7th
2015	24 Hours of Nürburgring – SP9 GT3	Bentley Team HTP	1	0	0	0	0	N/A	8th
2015	FIA World Endurance Championship – LMGTE Am	Dempsey Racing-Proton	8	1	1	0	3	131	5th
2015	24 Hours of Le Mans – LMGTE Am	Dempsey Racing-Proton	1	0	0	0	1	N/A	**2nd**
2016	IMSA SportsCar Championship – GT	Magnus Racing	3	1	0	0	2	88	18th
2016	European Le Mans Series – GTE	Proton Competition	5	0	0	0	0	40	10th
2016	24 Hours of Nürburgring – SP9	AMG-Team HTP Motorsport	1	0	0	0	1	N/A	**2nd**
2016	Blancpain Endurance Series	Rinaldi Racing	3	0	0	0	0	0	NC
2016	Blancpain Endurance Series – Am	Rinaldi Racing	1	0	0	0	1	24	17th
2016	GT Series Sprint Cup	Rinaldi Racing	6	0	0	0	0	19	14th
2017	Gulf 12 Hours – GT Pro	Rinaldi Racing	1	0	0	0	1	N/A	**2nd**
2017	SprintX GT Championship Series – GT Pro-Am	Magnus Racing	8	0	0	0	1	122	8th
2017	China GT Championship – GT3	FAW T2M	2	0	0	0	0	3	22nd
2017	Blancpain GT Series Endurance Cup	Emil Frey Jaguar Racing	5	0	0	0	0	1	50th
2017	Intercontinental GT Challenge – GT3	Emil Frey Jaguar Racing	1	0	0	0	0	0	NC
2017	VLN Series – SP9	Falken Motorsports	2	0	0	0	0	0	NC
2017	24 Hours of Nürburgring – SP9	Falken Motorsports	1	0	0	0	0	N/A	8th
2018	Blancpain GT Series Endurance Cup	Emil Frey Lexus Racing	5	1	0	0	1	35	9th
2018	24 Hours of Nürburgring – SP9	Frikadelli Racing Team	1	0	0	0	0	N/A	DNF
2018	Spa Six Hours Classic – GTP Over Class		1	0	0	0	0	N/A	10th
2019	IMSA SportsCar Championship – GT	Black Swan Racing	2	0	0	0	0	119	18th
2019	IMSA SportsCar Championship – GT	Park Place Motorsports	2	0	0	0	0	119	18th
2019	IMSA SportsCar Championship – GT	Paul Miller Racing	1	0	1	0	0	119	18th
2019	European Le Mans Series – LMGTE	Proton Competition	1	0	0	0	0	6	19th
2019	DMV Dunlop 60 – Class 1	HCB-Rutronik Racing	1	0	0	1	1	6.43	22nd
2019	DMV Gran Turismo TCC – Class 1	HCB-Rutronik Racing	1	0	0	0	0	0	NC
2019	24H GT Series – A6-Pro	Belgian Audi Club Team WRT	1	0	0	0	0	16	20th
2019	VLN Series – SP9	Bandoh Racing	1	0	0	0	0	3.75	88th
2019	24 Hours of Nürburgring – SP9	Bandoh Racing with Novel Racing	1	0	0	0	0	N/A	16th
2019	ADAC GT Masters	SSR Performance	2	0	0	0	0	0	NC
2019	Blancpain GT World Challenge Asia – Silver	HubAuto Corsa	2	0	0	2	1	21	16th
2019	Blancpain GT Series Endurance Cup	Dinamic Motorsport	1	0	0	0	0	0	NC
2020	24H GT Series – GT3	Herberth Motorsport	1	1	0	0	1	28	9th
2020	GT World Challenge Europe Endurance Cup – Am	Herberth Motorsport	1	0	0	0	0	46	11th
2021	24H GT Series – GT3	Herberth Motorsport	7	0	1	0	3	58	10th
2021	FIA World Endurance Championship – LMGTE Am	Dempsey-Proton Racing	3	0	0	0	0	21	16th
2021	24 Hours of Le Mans – LMGTE Am	Absolute Racing	1	0	0	0	0	N/A	7th
2021	Nürburgring Langstrecken-Serie – SP9 Pro-Am	Huber Motorsport	2	0	0	0	1	0	NC
2021	24 Hours of Nürburgring – SP9 Pro-Am	Huber Motorsport	1	1	0	0	1	N/A	**1st**
2022	Asian Le Mans Series – GT AM	Herberth Motorsport	4	0	0	0	4	60	**3rd**
2022	24H GT Series – GT3	Dinamic Motorsport	1	0	0	0	0	0	NC
2022	Nürburgring Langstrecken-Serie – SP9 Pro	Falken Motorsports	1	0	0	0	0	0	NC
2022	24 Hours of Nürburgring – SP9 Pro	Falken Motorsports	1	0	0	0	0	N/A	8th
2023	GT World Challenge Europe Endurance Cup – Bronze	Pure Rxcing	1	0	0	0	1	34	10th
2023	Le Mans Cup – GT3	IMSA LS Group Performance	2	0	0	0	0	0	NC
2023	Nürburgring Langstrecken-Serie – SP9 Pro	Lionspeed by Car Collection Motorsport	1	0	0	0	0	0	NC
2024	Intercontinental GT Challenge	Dinamic GT	1	0	0	0	0	2	24th
2024	Nürburgring Langstrecken-Serie – SP9 Pro	Dinamic GT	1	0	0	0	0	0	NC
2024	24 Hours of Nürburgring – SP9 Pro	Dinamic GT	1	0	0	0	0	N/A	12th
2026	Porsche Endurance Trophy Nürburgring Cup – CUP3 Am	Schmickler Performance powered by Ravenol							
2026	Nürburgring Langstrecken-Serie – SP9 Pro-Am	Hankook Competition	2	0	0	0	0	6	NC
2026	24 Hours of Nürburgring – SP9 Pro-Am	Hankook Competition	1	0	0	0	0	—N/a	4th
2026	Intercontinental GT Challenge	Hankook Competition	1	0	0	0	0	1	30th
2026	Nürburgring Langstrecken-Serie – SP7	W&S Motorsport	2	1	0	0	2	14	NC

=== Complete Porsche Supercup results ===
(key) (Races in bold indicate pole position) (Races in italics indicate fastest lap)

Year	Team	1	2	3	4	5	6	7	8	9	10	11	12	DC	Points
2002	Kadach Tuning + Service	ITA; 13	ESP; 7	AUT; 10	MON; 8	GER; 11	GBR; Ret	GER; 10	HUN; 15	BEL; Ret	ITA; 10	USA; Ret	USA; Ret	12th	57
2003	Aqua Nova Racing Team Kadach	ITA	ESP; 10	AUT; Ret	MON; 6	GER; 22	FRA; 19	GBR; 12	GER	HUN	ITA	USA	USA	NC†	27

† Seefried was removed from the 2003 standings as he entered less than six races

=== Complete European Le Mans Series results ===
(key) (Races in bold indicate pole position; results in italics indicate fastest lap)

Year	Entrant	Class	Chassis	Engine	1	2	3	4	5	6	Rank	Points
2006	Farnbacher Racing	GT2	Porsche 911 GT3-RSR	Porsche 3.6L Flat-6	IST; NC	SPA; 4	NUR; NC	DON; 4	JAR; Ret		13th	10
2010	Hankook Team Farnbacher	GT2	Porsche 997 GT3-RSR	Porsche 4.0 L Flat-6	LEC	SPA	ALG	HUN; 11	SIL		22nd	4
2016	Proton Competition	LMGTE	Porsche 911 RSR	Porsche 4.0 L Flat-6	SIL; 8	IMO	RBR; 6	LEC; 6	SPA; 4	EST; 6	10th	40
2019	Proton Competition	LMGTE	Porsche 911 RSR	Porsche 4.0 L Flat-6	LEC; 7	MNZ	CAT	SIL	SPA	ALG	19th	6

=== Complete ADAC GT Masters results ===
(key) (Races in bold indicate pole position) (Races in italics indicate fastest lap)

Year	Team	Car	1	2	3	4	5	6	7	8	9	10	11	12	13	14	15	16	DC	Points
2010	Dietmar Haggenmüller	Porsche 997 GT3 Cup S	OSC1; 1	OSC1; 2	SAC; 1	SAC; 2	HOC; 1	HOC; 2	ASS; 1	ASS; 2	LAU; 1	LAU; 2	NÜR; 1; 17	NÜR; 2; 14	OSC2; 1	OSC2; 2			NC	0
2011	Farnbacher ESET Racing	Ferrari 458 Italia GT3	OSC; 1	OSC; 2	SAC; 1	SAC; 2	ZOL; 1 Ret	ZOL; 2; 8	NÜR; 1	NÜR; 2	RBR; 1	RBR; 2	LAU; 1	LAU; 2	ASS; 1	ASS; 2	HOC; 1	HOC; 2	41st	4
2012	Team GT3 Kasko	Porsche 911 GT3 R	OSC; 1; 31	OSC; 2; 17	ZAN; 1; 26	ZAN; 2 Ret	SAC; 1; 22	SAC; 2; 22	NÜR; 1; 34	NÜR; 2 Ret	RBR; 1; 15	RBR; 2 Ret	LAU; 1; 19	LAU; 2; 18	NÜR; 1; 19	NÜR; 2; 16	HOC; 1	HOC; 2	NC	0
2013	Farnbacher Racing	Porsche 911 GT3 R	OSC; 1	OSC; 2	SPA; 1	SPA; 2	SAC; 1; 17	SAC; 2 Ret	NÜR; 1	NÜR; 2	RBR; 1	RBR; 2	LAU; 1	LAU; 2	SVK; 1	SVK; 2	HOC; 1	HOC; 2	NC	0
2019	SSR Performance	Porsche 911 GT3 R	OSC; 1	OSC; 2	MST; 1	MST; 2	RBR; 1	RBR; 2	ZAN; 1	ZAN; 2	NÜR; 1	NÜR; 2	HOC; 1; 20	HOC; 2; 12	SAC; 1	SAC; 2			NC	0

=== Complete Asian Le Mans Series results ===
(key) (Races in bold indicate pole position) (Races in italics indicate fastest lap)

Year	Team	Class	Car	Engine	1	2	3	4	Pos.	Points
2013	AAI-Rstrada	GTC	McLaren MP4-12C GT3	McLaren M838T 3.8 L Twin-turbo V8	INJ	FUJ; 5	ZHU; 5		10th	20
2013	AAI-Rstrada	LMGTE	Porsche 997 GT3-RSR	Porsche 4.0 L Flat-6				SEP; 3	3rd	18
2014	AAI-Rstrada	GT	BMW Z4 GT3	BMW 4.4 L V8	INJ; 1		SHA; 4	SEP; 3	2nd	70
2014	AAI-Rstrada	GT	Nissan GT-R GT3	Nissan 3.8 L V6		FUJ; 2			2nd	70
2022	Herberth Motorsport	GT Am	Porsche 911 GT3 R	Porsche 4.0 L Flat-6	DUB; 1; 3	DUB; 2; 3	ABU; 1; 3	ABU; 2; 3	3rd	60

=== Complete IMSA SportsCar Championship results ===
Year	Entrant	Class	Chassis	Engine	1	2	3	4	5	6	7	8	9	10	11	Rank	Points
2014	Snow Racing	GTD	Porsche 911 GT America	Porsche 4.0 L Flat-6	DAY; 3											29th	98
2014	Magnus Racing	GTD	Porsche 911 GT America	Porsche 4.0 L Flat-6		SEB; 1	LAG	DET	WGL	MOS	IMS	ELK	VIR	COA	PET; 3	29th	98
2015	Magnus Racing	GTD	Porsche 911 GT America	Porsche 4.0 L Flat-6	DAY; 11	SEB; 11	LAG	DET	WGL; 2	LIM	ELK	VIR	COA	PET		20th	77
2016	Magnus Racing	GTD	Audi R8 LMS	Audi 5.2L V10	DAY; 1	SEB; 3	LGA	DET	WGL	MOS	LIM	ELK	VIR	COA	PET; 11	18th	88
2019	Black Swan Racing	GTD	Porsche 911 GT3 R	Porsche 4.0L Flat-6	DAY; 14	SEB		DET	WGL; 10	MOS						18th	119
2019	Park Place Motorsports	GTD	Porsche 911 GT3 R	Porsche 4.0L Flat-6			MDO; 4				LIM; 4	ELK	VIR	LAG		18th	119
2019	Paul Miller Racing	GTD	Lamborghini Huracán GT3 Evo	Lamborghini 5.2 L V10											**PET**; 6	18th	119

=== Complete GT World Challenge results ===
==== GT World Challenge Europe Endurance Cup ====
(Races in bold indicate pole position) (Races in italics indicate fastest lap)

Year	Team	Car	Class	1	2	3	4	5	6	7	Pos.	Points
2014	GT Corse by Rinaldi	Ferrari 458 Italia GT3	Pro-Am	MNZ; 29†	SIL; 29	LEC; 36†	SPA; 6H; 44	SPA; 12H; 52	SPA; 24H; Ret		25th	4
2014	AF Corse	Ferrari 458 Italia GT3	Pro-Am							NÜR; 8	25th	4
2015	Rinaldi Racing	Ferrari 458 Italia GT3	Pro	MNZ	SIL; 7	LEC; Ret					24th	6
2015	Rinaldi Racing	Ferrari 458 Italia GT3	Pro-Am				SPA; 6H; 37	SPA; 12H; 27	SPA; 24H; 24	NÜR	25th	6
2016	Rinaldi Racing	Ferrari 458 Italia GT3	Pro	MNZ; 17	SIL; Ret	LEC; 42					NC	0
2016	Rinaldi Racing	Ferrari 488 GT3	Am				SPA; 6H; 54	SPA; 12H; 45	SPA; 24H; 36	NÜR	17th	24
2017	Emil Frey Racing	Emil Frey GT3 Jaguar	Pro	MNZ; Ret	SIL; 12	LEC; 34	SPA; 6H; 61	SPA; 12H; 61	SPA; 24H; Ret	CAT; 10	50th	1
2018	Emil Frey Lexus Racing	Lexus RC F GT3	Pro	MNZ; 17	SIL; 9	LEC; 1	SPA; 6H; 31	SPA; 12H; 20	SPA; 24H; 13	CAT; Ret	9th	35
2019	Dinamic Motorsport	Porsche 911 GT3 R	Pro	MNZ	SIL	LEC	SPA; 6H	SPA; 12H	SPA; 24H	CAT; Ret	NC	0
2020	Precote Herberth Motorsport	Porsche 911 GT3 R	Am	IMO	NÜR	SPA; 6H; 44	SPA; 12H; 45	SPA; 24H; Ret	LEC		11th	16
2023	Pure Rxcing	Porsche 911 GT3 R (992)	Bronze	MNZ	LEC	SPA; 6H; 25	SPA; 12H; 21	SPA; 24H; 15	NÜR	CAT	10th	34

^{†} Did not finish, but was classified as he had completed more than 90% of the race distance.

==== GT World Challenge Europe Sprint Cup ====
Year	Team	Car	Class	1	2	3	4	5	6	7	8	9	10	11	12	13	14	Pos.	Points
2015	Rinaldi Racing	Ferrari 458 Italia GT3	Pro	NOG; QR; 4	NOG; CR; 5	BRH; QR; 10	BRH; CR; Ret	ZOL; QR; 2	ZOL; CR; Ret	MSC; QR; 2	MSC; CR; 3	ALG; QR; 4	ALG; CR; 3	**MIS**; **QR**; 1	MIS; CR; 1	ZAN; QR	ZAN; CR	5th	92
2016	Rinaldi Racing	Ferrari 458 Italia GT3	Pro	MIS; QR; 6	MIS; CR; 6													14th	19
2016	Rinaldi Racing	Ferrari 488 GT3	Pro			BRH; QR; 14	BRH; CR; Ret	NÜR; QR; 11	NÜR; CR; 5	HUN; QR	HUN; CR	CAT; QR	CAT; CR					14th	19

=== Complete FIA World Endurance Championship results ===
Year	Entrant	Class	Car	Engine	1	2	3	4	5	6	7	8	Rank	Points
2015	Dempsey Racing-Proton	LMGTE Am	Porsche 911 RSR	Porsche 4.0 L Flat-6	SIL; 6	SPA; 5	LMS; 2	NÜR; 4	**COA**; 4	FUJ; 1	SHA; 4	BHR; 3	5th	131
2021	Dempsey-Proton Racing	LMGTE Am	Porsche 911 RSR-19	Porsche 4.2L Flat-6	SPA; 5	POR; 9	MON; 6	LMS	BHR	BHR			16th	21

=== Complete 24 Hours of Le Mans results ===
Year	Team	Co-Drivers	Car	Class	Laps	Pos.	Class Pos.
2015	(Germany) Dempsey-Proton Racing	(United States) Patrick Long (United States) Patrick Dempsey	Porsche 911 RSR	GTE; Am	330	22nd	**2nd**
2021	(Germany) Absolute Racing	(Indonesia) Andrew Haryanto (Belgium) Alessio Picariello	Porsche 911 RSR-19	GTE; Am	332	34th	7th
