= 2013 Asian Le Mans Series =

Seasons
- ← 2009 2014 →

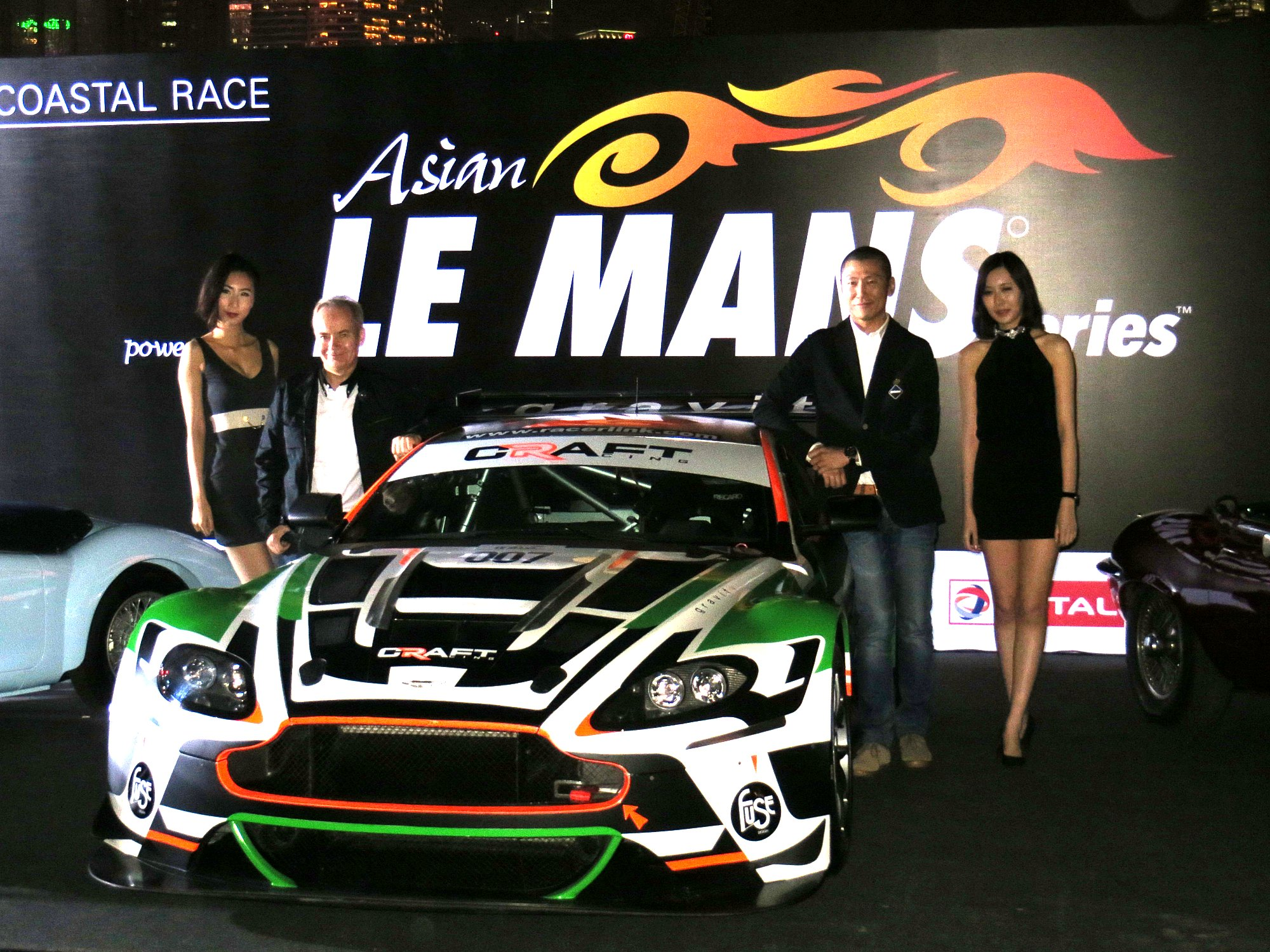
2013 Asian Le Mans launch event at Royal Hong Kong Yacht Club on 5 March 2013.

The 2013 Asian Le Mans Series was the second season of the Automobile Club de l'Ouest's Asian Le Mans Series endurance auto racing championship. The series was initially launched in 2009 at the 1000 km of Okayama, but did not resume the following year. The project was reinitialized by the Automobile Club de l'Ouest (ACO) in 2012, with the Chinese S2M Group serving as the series promoter and TS Motorsport serving as organizer. It is the fourth 24 Hours of Le Mans-based series created by the ACO, following the American Le Mans Series, European Le Mans Series, and FIA World Endurance Championship. The four event season began in Inje, South Korea on 4 August and ended in Selangor, Malaysia on 8 December 2013.

== Regulations ==
The Asian Le Mans Series follows much of the format utilized by the American and European Le Mans Series. Four categories of cars are eligible for the series: Le Mans Prototype 2 (LMP2), Le Mans Prototype Challenge (LMPC), GT Challenge (GTC), and GT Challenge Amateur (GTC Am). The GTC category is open to FIA GT3 category cars, cars from one-make series, and unique to the Asian series, JAF-GT, a road-derived variant car taking part in the GT300 category of the Japanese Super GT series. All four categories require at least one amateur driver and one professional driver in each car, although teams are allowed a maximum of three drivers per car. In order to boost Asian participation in the series, all cars must also have at least one driver of Asian nationality. An LMGTE category, identical to that used at Le Mans, was considered but later dropped for the 2013 season. For the 3 Hours of Fuji, an SGT class is added into the race, which is an optional point-scoring round of the GT300 class of the 2013 Super GT season. Entrants must keep their original driver lineup in order to be eligible for the race.

The team champions in the LMP2 will each automatic invitations in their category to the 2014 24 Hours of Le Mans, while the top two GTC class teams will earn invitations in the LMGTE Amateur category at Le Mans.

== Calendar ==
An initial six race 2013 calendar was revealed during the 2012 6 Hours of Shanghai, although several circuits had previously announced contracts with the series. The first half of the season was exclusively in China, with the Zhuhai International Circuit, Shanghai International Circuit, and Ordos International Circuit playing host. Following an agreement between the teams and organisers to delay and compress the 2013 season, the Shanghai and Ordos rounds were cancelled, and the season now begins in South Korea at the new Inje Speedium which was completed early in 2013. Fuji Speedway in Japan hosts the second round a month before the 6 Hours of Fuji World Endurance Championship event. Zhuhai, the sole remaining Chinese round, is moved back to October for the third race of the year. The Sepang International Circuit in Malaysia will serve as the finale for the season, replacing the initially scheduled Sentul International Circuit of Indonesia.

All events on the calendar will have practice sessions held on Friday, qualifying on Saturday, and the three-hour race on Sunday. Unlike the American and European Le Mans Series, the Asian Le Mans Series will not share any race weekends with the FIA World Endurance Championship.

| Rnd | Race | Circuit | Date |
|---|---|---|---|
| 1 | 3 Hours of Inje | Inje Speedium, Inje, South Korea | 4 August |
| 2 | 3 Hours of Fuji | Fuji Speedway, Oyama, Japan | 22 September |
| 3 | 3 Hours of Zhuhai | Zhuhai International Circuit, Zhuhai, China | 13 October |
| 4 | 3 Hours of Sepang | Sepang International Circuit, Selangor, Malaysia | 8 December |

== Teams and Drivers ==
=== LMP2 ===
All entries use Michelin tyres.

| Team | Car | Engine | No. | Drivers | Rounds |
|---|---|---|---|---|---|
| (Hong Kong) KCMG | Morgan LMP2 | Nissan VK45DE 4.5 L V8 | 18 | (United Kingdom) James Winslow | 1–2, 4 |
| (Hong Kong) KCMG | Morgan LMP2 | Nissan VK45DE 4.5 L V8 | 18 | (Malaysia) Akash Nandy | 1 |
| (Hong Kong) KCMG | Morgan LMP2 | Nissan VK45DE 4.5 L V8 | 18 | (Republic of Ireland) Gary Thompson | 1 |
| (Hong Kong) KCMG | Morgan LMP2 | Nissan VK45DE 4.5 L V8 | 18 | (United Kingdom) Richard Bradley | 2 |
| (Hong Kong) KCMG | Morgan LMP2 | Nissan VK45DE 4.5 L V8 | 18 | (Japan) Hiroshi Koizumi | 2 |
| (Hong Kong) KCMG | Morgan LMP2 | Nissan VK45DE 4.5 L V8 | 18 | (Japan) Tsugio Matsuda | 4 |
| (Hong Kong) KCMG | Oreca 03 | Nissan VK45DE 4.5 L V8 | 18 | (Australia) Jordan Oon | 3 |
| (Hong Kong) KCMG | Oreca 03 | Nissan VK45DE 4.5 L V8 | 18 | (Republic of Ireland) Gary Thompson | 3 |
| (Hong Kong) KCMG | Oreca 03 | Nissan VK45DE 4.5 L V8 | 18 | (United Kingdom) James Winslow | 3 |
| (France) OAK Racing | Morgan LMP2 | Judd HK 3.6 L V8 | 24 | (China) David Cheng | All |
| (France) OAK Racing | Morgan LMP2 | Judd HK 3.6 L V8 | 24 | (Chinese Taipei) Jeffrey Lee | 1–2 |
| (France) OAK Racing | Morgan LMP2 | Judd HK 3.6 L V8 | 24 | (China) Ho-Pin Tung | 1, 3–4 |
| (France) OAK Racing | Morgan LMP2 | Judd HK 3.6 L V8 | 24 | (China) Congfu Cheng | 2 |
| (France) OAK Racing | Morgan LMP2 | Judd HK 3.6 L V8 | 24 | (Hong Kong) Shaun Thong | 3 |
| (Hong Kong) Craft Racing | Oreca 03 | Nissan VK45DE 4.5 L V8 | 27 | (United Kingdom) Richard Bradley | 4 |
| (Hong Kong) Craft Racing | Oreca 03 | Nissan VK45DE 4.5 L V8 | 27 | (China) Kevin Pu Junjin | 4 |
| (Hong Kong) Craft Racing | Oreca 03 | Nissan VK45DE 4.5 L V8 | 27 | (Republic of Ireland) Dan Polley | 4 |

=== LMGTE ===
All entries use Michelin tyres.

| Team | Car | Engine | No. | Drivers | Rounds |
|---|---|---|---|---|---|
| (Chinese Taipei) AAI-Rstrada | Porsche 997 GT3-RSR | Porsche M97/74 4.0 L Flat-6 | 35 | (Chinese Taipei) Han-Chen Chen | 4 |
| (Chinese Taipei) AAI-Rstrada | Porsche 997 GT3-RSR | Porsche M97/74 4.0 L Flat-6 | 35 | (Japan) Ryohei Sakaguchi | 4 |
| (Chinese Taipei) AAI-Rstrada | Porsche 997 GT3-RSR | Porsche M97/74 4.0 L Flat-6 | 35 | (Germany) Marco Seefried | 4 |
| (Japan) Team Taisan Ken Endless | Ferrari 458 Italia GT2 | Ferrari F136 4.5 L V8 | 70 | (Japan) Naoki Yokomizo | 1, 3–4 |
| (Japan) Team Taisan Ken Endless | Ferrari 458 Italia GT2 | Ferrari F136 4.5 L V8 | 70 | (Japan) Kamui Kobayashi | 1 |
| (Japan) Team Taisan Ken Endless | Ferrari 458 Italia GT2 | Ferrari F136 4.5 L V8 | 70 | (Japan) Akira Iida | 2–4 |
| (Japan) Team Taisan Ken Endless | Ferrari 458 Italia GT2 | Ferrari F136 4.5 L V8 | 70 | (Japan) Shogo Mitsuyama | 2–4 |
| (Japan) Team Taisan Ken Endless | Ferrari 458 Italia GT2 | Ferrari F136 4.5 L V8 | 70 | (Japan) Shinji Nakano | 2 |

=== GTC ===
All entries use Michelin tyres.

| Team | Car | Engine | No. | Drivers | Rounds |
|---|---|---|---|---|---|
| (Hong Kong) Craft Racing | Aston Martin V12 Vantage GT3 | Aston Martin AM28 6.0 L V12 | 007 | (Hong Kong) Frank Yu | 1–2 |
| (Hong Kong) Craft Racing | Aston Martin V12 Vantage GT3 | Aston Martin AM28 6.0 L V12 | 007 | (Germany) Stefan Mücke | 1, 4 |
| (Hong Kong) Craft Racing | Aston Martin V12 Vantage GT3 | Aston Martin AM28 6.0 L V12 | 007 | (Japan) Keita Sawa | 1, 4 |
| (Hong Kong) Craft Racing | Aston Martin V12 Vantage GT3 | Aston Martin AM28 6.0 L V12 | 007 | (United Kingdom) Richard Lyons | 2 |
| (Hong Kong) Craft Racing | Ford GT GT3 | Ford Cammer 5.0 L V8 | 007 | (Hong Kong) Darryl O'Young | 3 |
| (Hong Kong) Craft Racing | Ford GT GT3 | Ford Cammer 5.0 L V8 | 007 | (Japan) Keita Sawa | 3 |
| (Hong Kong) Craft Racing | Ford GT GT3 | Ford Cammer 5.0 L V8 | 007 | (Hong Kong) Frank Yu | 3 |
| (Hong Kong) Craft Racing | Aston Martin V12 Vantage GT3 | Aston Martin AM28 6.0 L V12 | 009 | (Japan) Tomonobu Fujii | 4 |
| (Hong Kong) Craft Racing | Aston Martin V12 Vantage GT3 | Aston Martin AM28 6.0 L V12 | 009 | (Hong Kong) Darryl O'Young | 4 |
| (Hong Kong) Craft Racing | Aston Martin V12 Vantage GT3 | Aston Martin AM28 6.0 L V12 | 009 | (Hong Kong) Frank Yu | 4 |
| (Japan) Pacific Direction Racing | Porsche 911 GT3-R | Porsche 4.0 L Flat-6 | 9 | (Japan) Akira Mizutani | 2 |
| (Japan) Pacific Direction Racing | Porsche 911 GT3-R | Porsche 4.0 L Flat-6 | 9 | (Japan) Yuya Sakamoto | 2 |
| (Japan) Pacific Direction Racing | Porsche 911 GT3-R | Porsche 4.0 L Flat-6 | 9 | (Japan) You Yokomaku | 2 |
| (Japan) Team Taisan Ken Endless | Porsche 996 GT3-RS | Porsche M96/77 3.6 L Flat-6 | 26 | (Japan) Kyosuke Mineo | 1 |
| (Japan) Team Taisan Ken Endless | Porsche 996 GT3-RS | Porsche M96/77 3.6 L Flat-6 | 26 | (Japan) Yukinori Taniguchi | 1 |
| (Japan) Team Taisan Ken Endless | Porsche 996 GT3-RS | Porsche M96/77 3.6 L Flat-6 | 26 | (Japan) Akihiro Asai | 2 |
| (Japan) Team Taisan Ken Endless | Porsche 996 GT3-RS | Porsche M96/77 3.6 L Flat-6 | 26 | (Japan) Naoya Gamou | 2 |
| (Singapore) Clearwater Racing | Ferrari 458 Italia GT3 | Ferrari F136 4.5 L V8 | 33 | (Malaysia) Weng Sun Mok | 4 |
| (Singapore) Clearwater Racing | Ferrari 458 Italia GT3 | Ferrari F136 4.5 L V8 | 33 | (Finland) Toni Vilander | 4 |
| (China) BBT Racing | Lamborghini Gallardo GT3 | Lamborghini 5.2 L V10 | 37 | (China) Anthony Liu | All |
| (China) BBT Racing | Lamborghini Gallardo GT3 | Lamborghini 5.2 L V10 | 37 | (Italy) Davide Rizzo | All |
| (China) BBT Racing | Lamborghini Gallardo GT3 | Lamborghini 5.2 L V10 | 37 | (Italy) Max Wiser | 1–3 |
| (China) BBT Racing | Lamborghini Gallardo GT3 | Lamborghini 5.2 L V10 | 37 | (Italy) Fabio Babini | 4 |
| (Italy) AF Corse | Ferrari 458 Italia GT3 | Ferrari F136 4.5 L V8 | 77 | (Italy) Andrea Bertolini | All |
| (Italy) AF Corse | Ferrari 458 Italia GT3 | Ferrari F136 4.5 L V8 | 77 | (Italy) Michele Rugolo | All |
| (Italy) AF Corse | Ferrari 458 Italia GT3 | Ferrari F136 4.5 L V8 | 77 | (Australia) Steve Wyatt | All |
| (Chinese Taipei) AAI-Rstrada | McLaren MP4-12C GT3 | McLaren M838T 3.8 L Twin-turbo V8 | 91 | (Chinese Taipei) Jun-San Chen | 1–3 |
| (Chinese Taipei) AAI-Rstrada | McLaren MP4-12C GT3 | McLaren M838T 3.8 L Twin-turbo V8 | 91 | (Japan) Akira Iida | 1 |
| (Chinese Taipei) AAI-Rstrada | McLaren MP4-12C GT3 | McLaren M838T 3.8 L Twin-turbo V8 | 91 | (Japan) Tatsuya Tanigawa | 2–3 |
| (Chinese Taipei) AAI-Rstrada | McLaren MP4-12C GT3 | McLaren M838T 3.8 L Twin-turbo V8 | 91 | (Germany) Marco Seefried | 2 |
| (Chinese Taipei) AAI-Rstrada | McLaren MP4-12C GT3 | McLaren M838T 3.8 L Twin-turbo V8 | 91 | (Japan) Takeshi Tsuchiya | 3 |
| (Chinese Taipei) AAI-Rstrada | McLaren MP4-12C GT3 | McLaren M838T 3.8 L Twin-turbo V8 | 92 | (Chinese Taipei) Han-Chen Chen | 1–3 |
| (Chinese Taipei) AAI-Rstrada | McLaren MP4-12C GT3 | McLaren M838T 3.8 L Twin-turbo V8 | 92 | (Japan) Akihiro Asai | 1 |
| (Chinese Taipei) AAI-Rstrada | McLaren MP4-12C GT3 | McLaren M838T 3.8 L Twin-turbo V8 | 92 | (Thailand) Somchai Saksirivatekul | 1 |
| (Chinese Taipei) AAI-Rstrada | McLaren MP4-12C GT3 | McLaren M838T 3.8 L Twin-turbo V8 | 92 | (Japan) Yasushi Kikuchi | 2–3 |
| (Chinese Taipei) AAI-Rstrada | McLaren MP4-12C GT3 | McLaren M838T 3.8 L Twin-turbo V8 | 92 | (Germany) Marco Seefried | 3 |
| (Chinese Taipei) AAI-Rstrada | BMW Z4 GT3 | BMW P65B44 4.4 L V8 | 91 | (Chinese Taipei) Jun-San Chen | 4 |
| (Chinese Taipei) AAI-Rstrada | BMW Z4 GT3 | BMW P65B44 4.4 L V8 | 91 | (Japan) Tatsuya Tanigawa | 4 |
| (Chinese Taipei) AAI-Rstrada | BMW Z4 GT3 | BMW P65B44 4.4 L V8 | 91 | (Japan) Takeshi Tsuchiya | 4 |

=== GTC Am ===
All entries use Michelin tyres.

| Team | Car | Engine | No. | Drivers | Rounds |
|---|---|---|---|---|---|
| (Chinese Taipei) Gama Racing | Lamborghini Gallardo | Lamborghini 5.2 L V10 | 36 | (Chinese Taipei) Michael Huang | 4 |
| (Chinese Taipei) Gama Racing | Lamborghini Gallardo | Lamborghini 5.2 L V10 | 36 | (Chinese Taipei) Han Lin | 4 |
| (Chinese Taipei) Gama Racing | Lamborghini Gallardo | Lamborghini 5.2 L V10 | 36 | (Chinese Taipei) Hanss Lin | 4 |
| (Malaysia) Team Primemantle Aylezo | Lamborghini Gallardo | Lamborghini 5.2 L V10 | 69 | (Malaysia) Zen Low | 4 |
| (Malaysia) Team Primemantle Aylezo | Lamborghini Gallardo | Lamborghini 5.2 L V10 | 69 | (Sri Lanka) Dilantha Malagamuwa | 4 |
| (Malaysia) Team Primemantle Aylezo | Lamborghini Gallardo | Lamborghini 5.2 L V10 | 69 | (Italy) Giorgio Sanna | 4 |
| (Malaysia) Mike Racing | Lamborghini Gallardo | Lamborghini 5.2 L V10 | 96 | (Malaysia) Michael Chua Khian Keng | 4 |
| (Malaysia) Mike Racing | Lamborghini Gallardo | Lamborghini 5.2 L V10 | 96 | (Malaysia) Rick Cheang Wan Chin | 4 |
| (Malaysia) Mike Racing | Lamborghini Gallardo | Lamborghini 5.2 L V10 | 96 | (Malaysia) Joseph Chua Thian Song | 4 |

=== SGT ===
| Team | Make | Car | No. | Drivers | Tyre | Rounds |
|---|---|---|---|---|---|---|
| (Japan) Team Taisan Ken Endless | Porsche | Porsche 911 GT3 R | 0 | (Japan) Kyosuke Mineo | Y | 2 |
| (Japan) Team Taisan Ken Endless | Porsche | Porsche 911 GT3 R | 0 | (Japan) Naoki Yokomizo | Y | 2 |
| (Japan) Cars Tokai Dream28 | McLaren | McLaren MP4-12C GT3 | 2 | (Japan) Hiroki Katoh | Y | 2 |
| (Japan) Cars Tokai Dream28 | McLaren | McLaren MP4-12C GT3 | 2 | (Japan) Kazuho Takahashi | Y | 2 |
| (Japan) Team Mach | Nissan | Nissan GT-R GT3 | 5 | (Japan) Tetsuji Tamanaka | Y | 2 |
| (Japan) Team Mach | Nissan | Nissan GT-R GT3 | 5 | (Japan) Naoya Yamano | Y | 2 |
| (Japan) Gainer | Mercedes-Benz | Mercedes-Benz SLS AMG GT3 | 11 | (Japan) Katsuyuki Hiranaka | D | 2 |
| (Japan) Gainer | Mercedes-Benz | Mercedes-Benz SLS AMG GT3 | 11 | (Sweden) Björn Wirdheim | D | 2 |
| (Japan) Team Mugen | Honda | Honda CR-Z | 16 | (Japan) Hideki Mutoh | B | 2 |
| (Japan) Team Mugen | Honda | Honda CR-Z | 16 | (Japan) Yuhki Nakayama | B | 2 |
| (Japan) apr | Nissan | Nissan GT-R GT3 | 30 | (Japan) Yuki Iwasaki | Y | 2 |
| (Japan) apr | Nissan | Nissan GT-R GT3 | 30 | (Japan) Kenji Kobayashi | Y | 2 |
| (Japan) apr | Nissan | Nissan GT-R GT3 | 30 | (United States) Igor Sushko | Y | 2 |
| (Japan) OKINAWA-IMP RACING with SHIFT | Mercedes-Benz | Mercedes-Benz SLS AMG GT3 | 52 | (Japan) Hironori Takeuchi | Y | 2 |
| (Japan) OKINAWA-IMP RACING with SHIFT | Mercedes-Benz | Mercedes-Benz SLS AMG GT3 | 52 | (Japan) Takeshi Tsuchiya | Y | 2 |
| (Japan) OKINAWA-IMP RACING with SHIFT | Mercedes-Benz | Mercedes-Benz SLS AMG GT3 | 52 | (Japan) Motoyoshi Yoshida | Y | 2 |
| (Japan) Autobacs Racing Team Aguri | Honda | Honda CR-Z | 55 | (Japan) Takashi Kobayashi | B | 2 |
| (Japan) Autobacs Racing Team Aguri | Honda | Honda CR-Z | 55 | (Japan) Tomoki Nojiri | B | 2 |
| (Japan) Autobacs Racing Team Aguri | Honda | Honda CR-Z | 55 | (Japan) Shinichi Takagi | B | 2 |
| (Japan) R&D Sport | Subaru | Subaru BRZ | 61 | (Japan) Kota Sasaki | M | 2 |
| (Japan) R&D Sport | Subaru | Subaru BRZ | 61 | (Japan) Tetsuya Yamano | M | 2 |
| (Japan) Leon Racing | Mercedes-Benz | Mercedes-Benz SLS AMG GT3 | 62 | (Japan) Haruki Kurosawa | Y | 2 |
| (Japan) Leon Racing | Mercedes-Benz | Mercedes-Benz SLS AMG GT3 | 62 | (Japan) Tsubasa Kurosawa | Y | 2 |

== Season results ==
| Rnd. | Circuit | LMP2 Winning Team | LMGTE Winning Team | GTC Winning Team | GTC Am Winning Team | SGT Winning Team | Results |
| Rnd. | Circuit | LMP2 Winning Drivers | LMGTE Winning Drivers | GTC Winning Drivers | GTC Am Winning Drivers | SGT Winning Drivers | Results |
|---|---|---|---|---|---|---|---|
| 1 | Inje | (Hong Kong) No. 18 KCMG | (Japan) No. 70 Team Taisan Ken Endless | (Italy) No. 77 AF Corse | No entries | Did not participate | Report |
| 1 | Inje | (Malaysia) Akash Nandy (Republic of Ireland) Gary Thompson (United Kingdom) James Winslow | (Japan) Kamui Kobayashi (Japan) Naoki Yokomizo | (Italy) Andrea Bertolini (Italy) Michele Rugolo (Australia) Steve Wyatt | No entries | Did not participate | Report |
| 2 | Fuji | (Hong Kong) No. 18 KCMG | (Japan) No. 70 Team Taisan Ken Endless | (Hong Kong) No. 007 Craft Racing | No entries | (Japan) No. 16 Team Mugen | Report |
| 2 | Fuji | (United Kingdom) Richard Bradley (Japan) Hiroshi Koizumi (United Kingdom) James Winslow | (Japan) Akira Iida (Japan) Shogo Mitsuyama (Japan) Shinji Nakano | (United Kingdom) Richard Lyons (Hong Kong) Frank Yu | No entries | (Japan) Hideki Mutoh (Japan) Yuhki Nakayama | Report |
| 3 | Zhuhai | (France) No. 24 OAK Racing | (Japan) No. 70 Team Taisan Ken Endless | (Italy) No. 77 AF Corse | No entries | Did not participate | Report |
| 3 | Zhuhai | (China) David Cheng (Hong Kong) Shaun Thong (China) Ho-Pin Tung | (Japan) Akira Iida (Japan) Shogo Mitsuyama (Japan) Naoki Yokomizo | (Italy) Andrea Bertolini (Italy) Michele Rugolo (Australia) Steve Wyatt | No entries | Did not participate | Report |
| 4 | Sepang | (France) No. 24 OAK Racing | (Japan) No. 70 Team Taisan Ken Endless | (Singapore) No. 33 Clearwater Racing | (Malaysia) No. 69 Team; Primemantle Aylezo | Did not participate | Report |
| 4 | Sepang | (China) David Cheng (China) Ho-Pin Tung | (Japan) Akira Iida (Japan) Shogo Mitsuyama (Japan) Naoki Yokomizo | (Singapore) Weng Sun Mok (Finland) Toni Vilander | (Malaysia) Zen Low (Sri Lanka) Dilantha Malagamuwa (Italy) Giorgio Sanna | Did not participate | Report |

== Championship Standings ==
Scoring system

Points System
| Position | | | | | | | | | | Pole Position |
| 1st | 2nd | 3rd | 4th | 5th | 6th | 7th | 8th | 9th | 10th | Pole Position |
|---|---|---|---|---|---|---|---|---|---|---|
| 25 | 18 | 15 | 12 | 10 | 8 | 6 | 4 | 2 | 1 | 1 |

== Teams Championships ==
The winners of the LMP2 championship and the top two finishers in the GTC championship earn automatic entry to the 2014 24 Hours of Le Mans.

=== LMP2 Standings ===
| Pos | Team | Chassis | Engine | INJ | FUJ | ZHU | SEP | Total | Private Manufacturers |
|---|---|---|---|---|---|---|---|---|---|
| 1 | (France) OAK Racing | Morgan LMP2 | Judd HK 3.6 L V8 | 19 | 19 | 26 | 25 | 89 | Morgan158 Points |
| 2 | (Hong Kong) KCMG | Morgan LMP2 | Nissan VK45DE 4.5 L V8 | 25 | 25 | | 19 | 87 | Oreca 33 Points |
| 2 | (Hong Kong) KCMG | Oreca 03 | Nissan VK45DE 4.5 L V8 | | | 18 | | 87 | |
| 3 | (Hong Kong) Craft Racing | Oreca 03 | Nissan VK45DE 4.5 L V8 | | | | 15 | 15 | |

=== GTE Standings ===
| Pos | Team | Chassis | Engine | INJ | FUJ | ZHU | SEP | Total | Manufacturers |
|---|---|---|---|---|---|---|---|---|---|
| 1 | (Japan) Team Taisan Ken Endless | Ferrari 458 Italia GT2 | Ferrari F142 4.5 L V8 | 26 | 26 | 26 | 26 | 104 | Ferrari 104 Points |
| 2 | (Chinese Taipei) Team AAI Rstrada | Porsche 997 GT3-RSR | Porsche 4.0 L Flat-6 | | | | 18 | 18 | Porsche 18 Points |

=== GTC Standings ===
| Pos | Team | Chassis | Engine | INJ | FUJ | ZHU | SEP | Total | Manufacturers |
|---|---|---|---|---|---|---|---|---|---|
| 1 | (Italy) AF Corse | Ferrari 458 Italia GT3 | Ferrari F142 4.5 L V8 | 25 | 18 | 26 | 18 | 87 | Ferrari113 Points |
| 2 | (Hong Kong) #007 Craft Racing | Aston Martin V12 Vantage GT3 | Aston Martin 6.0 L V12 | 1 | 26 | | 15 | 57 | Aston Martin52 Points |
| 2 | (Hong Kong) #007 Craft Racing | Ford GT GT3 | Ford 5.0 L V8 | | | 15 | | 57 | Mclaren50 Points |
| 3 | (Chinese Taipei) #91 Team AAI Rstrada | McLaren MP4-12C GT3 | McLaren 3.8L V8 | 12 | 10 | 18 | | 48 | Porsche45 Points |
| 3 | (Chinese Taipei) #91 Team AAI Rstrada | BMW Z4 GT3 | BMW 4.4 L V8 | | | | 8 | 48 | Lamborghini39 Points |
| 4 | (China) BBT Racing | Lamborghini Gallardo GT3 | Lamborghini 5.2L V10 | 15 | 0 | 12 | 12 | 39 | Ford15 Points |
| 5 | (Japan) Team Taisan Ken Endless | Porsche 996 GT3-RS | Porsche 3.6 L Flat-6 | 18 | 12 | | | 30 | BMW8 Points |
| 6 | (Singapore) Clearwater Racing | Ferrari 458 Italia GT3 | Ferrari F142 4.5 L V8 | | | | 26 | 26 | |
| 7 | (Japan) Pacific Direction Racing | Porsche 911 GT3-R | Porsche 4.0 L Flat-6 | | 15 | | | 15 | |
| 8 | (Chinese Taipei) #92 Team AAI Rstrada | McLaren MP4-12C GT3 | McLaren 3.8L V8 | 0 | 0 | 10 | | 10 | |
| 9 | (Hong Kong) #009 Craft Racing | Aston Martin V12 Vantage GT3 | Aston Martin 6.0 L V12 | | | | 10 | 10 | |

== Drivers Championships ==
=== LMP2 Standings ===
| Pos | Driver | Team | INJ | FUJ | ZHU | SEP | Total |
|---|---|---|---|---|---|---|---|
| 1 | (China) David Cheng | (France) OAK Racing | 19 | 19 | 26 | 25 | 89 |
| 2 | (United Kingdom) James Winslow | (Hong Kong) KCMG | 25 | 25 | 18 | 19 | 87 |
| 3 | (China) Ho-Pin Tung | (France) OAK Racing | 19 | | 26 | 25 | 70 |
| 4 | (Republic of Ireland) Gary Thompson | (Hong Kong) KCMG | 25 | | 18 | | 43 |
| 5 | (United Kingdom) Richard Bradley | (Hong Kong) KCMG | | 25 | | | 40 |
| 5 | (United Kingdom) Richard Bradley | (Hong Kong) Craft Racing | | | | 15 | 40 |
| 6 | (Chinese Taipei) Jeffrey Lee | (France) OAK Racing | 19 | 19 | | | 38 |
| 7 | (Hong Kong) Shaun Thong | (France) OAK Racing | | | 26 | | 26 |
| 8 | (Malaysia) Akash Nandy | (Hong Kong) KCMG | 25 | | | | 25 |
| 8 | (Japan) Hiroshi Koizumi | (Hong Kong) KCMG | | 25 | | | 25 |
| 9 | (China) Cong Fu Cheng | (France) OAK Racing | | 19 | | | 19 |
| 9 | (Japan) Tsugio Matsuda | (Hong Kong) KCMG | | | | 19 | 19 |
| 10 | (Australia) Jordan Oon | (Hong Kong) KCMG | | | 18 | | 18 |
| 11 | (China) Jun Jin Pu | (Hong Kong) Craft Racing | | | | 15 | 15 |
| 11 | (Republic of Ireland) Dan Polley | (Hong Kong) Craft Racing | | | | 15 | 15 |

=== GTE Standings ===
| Pos | Driver | Team | INJ | FUJ | ZHU | SEP | Total |
|---|---|---|---|---|---|---|---|
| 1 | (Japan) Naoki Yokomizo | (Japan) Team Taisan Ken Endless | 26 | | 26 | 26 | 78 |
| 1 | (Japan) Akira Iida | (Japan) Team Taisan Ken Endless | | 26 | 26 | 26 | 78 |
| 1 | (Japan) Shogo Mitsuyama | (Japan) Team Taisan Ken Endless | | 26 | 26 | 26 | 78 |
| 2 | (Japan) Kamui Kobayashi | (Japan) Team Taisan Ken Endless | 26 | | | | 26 |
| 2 | (Japan) Shinji Nakano | (Japan) Team Taisan Ken Endless | | 26 | | | 26 |
| 3 | (Chinese Taipei) Morris Chen | (Chinese Taipei) Team AAI Rstrada | | | | 18 | 18 |
| 3 | (Japan) Ryohei Sakaguchi | (Chinese Taipei) Team AAI Rstrada | | | | 18 | 18 |
| 3 | (Germany) Marco Seefried | (Chinese Taipei) Team AAI Rstrada | | | | 18 | 18 |

=== GTC Standings ===
| Pos | Driver | Team | INJ | FUJ | ZHU | SEP | Total |
|---|---|---|---|---|---|---|---|
| 1 | (Italy) Andrea Bertolini | (Italy) AF Corse | 25 | 18 | 26 | 18 | 87 |
| 1 | (Italy) Michele Rugolo | (Italy) AF Corse | 25 | 18 | 26 | 18 | 87 |
| 1 | (Australia) Steve Wyatt | (Italy) AF Corse | 25 | 18 | 26 | 18 | 87 |
| 2 | (Hong Kong) Frank Yu | (Hong Kong) Craft Racing | 1 | 26 | 15 | 10 | 52 |
| 3 | (Chinese Taipei) Jun San Chen | (Chinese Taipei) Team AAI Rstrada | 12 | 10 | 18 | 8 | 48 |
| 4 | (China) Anthony Liu | (China) BBT Racing | 15 | 0 | 12 | 12 | 39 |
| 4 | (Italy) Davide Rizzo | (China) BBT Racing | 15 | 0 | 12 | 12 | 39 |
| 5 | (Japan) Tatsuya Tanigawa | (Chinese Taipei) Team AAI Rstrada | | 10 | 18 | 8 | 36 |
| 6 | (Japan) Keita Sawa | (Hong Kong) Craft Racing | 1 | | 15 | 15 | 31 |
| 7 | (Italy) Massimilliano Wiser | (China) BBT Racing | 15 | 0 | 12 | | 27 |
| 8 | (United Kingdom) Richard Lyons | (Hong Kong) Craft Racing | | 26 | | | 26 |
| 8 | (Japan) Takeshi Tsuchiya | (Chinese Taipei) Team AAI Rstrada | | | 18 | 8 | 26 |
| 8 | (Singapore) Weng Sun Mok | (Singapore) Clearwater Racing | | | | 26 | 26 |
| 8 | (Finland) Toni Vilander | (Singapore) Clearwater Racing | | | | 26 | 26 |
| 9 | (Hong Kong) Darryl O'Young | (Hong Kong) Craft Racing | | | 15 | 10 | 25 |
| 10 | (Germany) Marco Seefried | (Chinese Taipei) Team AAI Rstrada | | 10 | 10 | | 20 |
| 11 | (Japan) Kyosuke Mineo | (Japan) Team Taisan Ken Endless | 18 | | | | 18 |
| 11 | (Japan) Yukinori Taniguchi | (Japan) Team Taisan Ken Endless | 18 | | | | 18 |
| 12 | (Germany) Stefan Mücke | (Hong Kong) Craft Racing | 1 | | | 15 | 16 |
| 13 | (Japan) Akira Mizutani | (Japan) Pacific Direction Racing | | 15 | | | 15 |
| 13 | (Japan) Yuya Sakamoto | (Japan) Pacific Direction Racing | | 15 | | | 15 |
| 13 | (Japan) You Yokomaku | (Japan) Pacific Direction Racing | | 15 | | | 15 |
| 14 | (Japan) Akihiro Asai | (Chinese Taipei) Team AAI Rstrada | 0 | | | | 12 |
| 14 | (Japan) Akihiro Asai | (Japan) Team Taisan Ken Endless | | 12 | | | 12 |
| 14 | (Japan) Naoya Gamou | (Japan) Team Taisan Ken Endless | | 12 | | | 12 |
| 14 | (Japan) Akira Iida | (Chinese Taipei) Team AAI Rstrada | 12 | | | | 12 |
| 14 | (Italy) Fabio Babini | (China) BBT Racing | | | | 12 | 12 |
| 15 | (Chinese Taipei) Morris Chen | (Chinese Taipei) Team AAI Rstrada | 0 | 0 | 10 | | 10 |
| 15 | (Japan) Yasushi Kikuchi | (Chinese Taipei) Team AAI Rstrada | | 0 | 10 | | 10 |
| 15 | (Japan) Tomonobu Fujii | (Hong Kong) Craft Racing | | | | 10 | 10 |
| | (Thailand) Somchai Saksirivatekul | (Chinese Taipei) Team AAI Rstrada | 0 | | | | 0 |
