= Gary Thompson (racing driver) =

Irish racecar driver (born 1992)

- Nationality: (Republic of Ireland) Irish
- Born: 31 May 1992 (age 34) Dublin (Ireland)

FIA European Formula 3 Championship career
- Debut season: 2013
- Current team: Romeo Ferraris
- Categorisation: FIA Silver
- Car number: 22

Previous series
- 2013 2010-12 2009: Asian Le Mans Series - LMP2; Japanese Formula Three; Formula BMW Pacific

Awards
- 2009: FBMW Pacific Rookie Cup

Gary Thompson (born 31 May 1992 in Dublin, Ireland) is an Irish racecar driver.

== Career ==
Thompson started racing in karts in 2003, finishing fifth in the Cadet Irish Championship. His karting career continued in the British Cadet Championship and later the British JICA Championship, where he finished sixth in 2006 and third in 2007.

In 2009, Thompson moved into Formula Cars and raced in the Formula BMW Pacific Championship, winning the opening race at the Sepang International Circuit, Malaysia. In total, Thompson had 11 podium finishes and finished second overall, winning the Rookie of the Year Cup. Thompson spent the following years racing in the Japanese Formula 3 Championship with the KC Motorgroup (KCMG) team, while also testing Super Formula for the KCMG team at the Fuji Speedway.

Thompson briefly raced with the Romeo-Ferraris team in the FIA European Formula 3 Championship, but left the squad after two rounds. Following a successful F3 career, Thompson raced for KCMG team in the Asian Le Mans Series in the LMP2 category, winning one race and having the fastest lap in two races he competed in.
