= Pescarolo 01 =

Sports prototype racing car

Pescarolo 01/01 Evo Morgan LMP2/LMP2 Evo
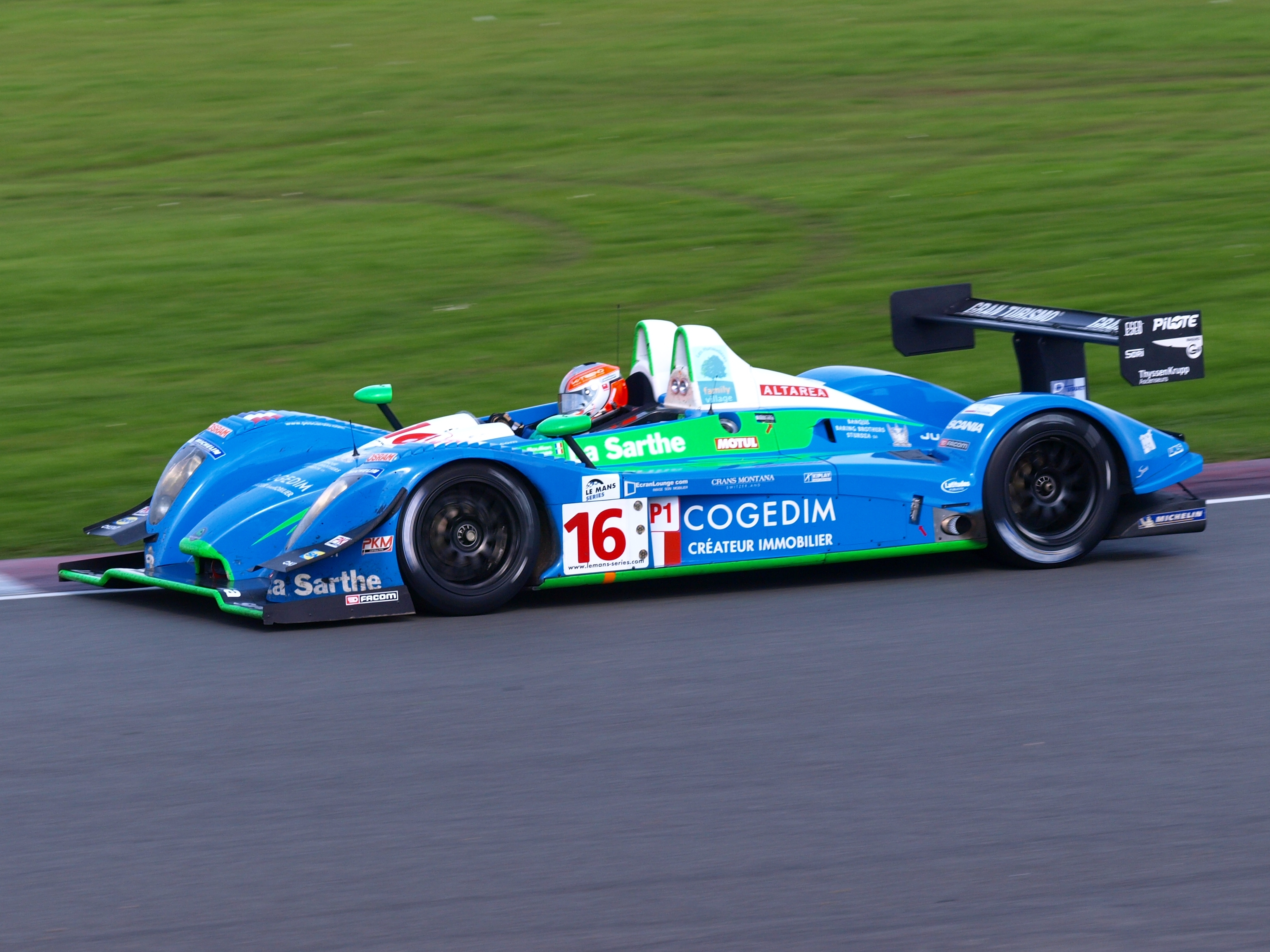
- Romain Dumas driving the 01 at the 2008 1000 km of Silverstone
- Category: Le Mans Prototype (LMP1 and LMP2)
- Constructor: Pescarolo Sport
- Designer: André de Cortanze
- Successor: Pescarolo 03

Technical specifications
- Chassis: Carbon fibre monocoque
- Suspension (front): Double wishbone, push rod operated over damper
- Suspension (rear): Double wishbone, push rod operated over damper
- Wheelbase: 2,795 mm (110.0 in)
- Engine: Judd GV5.5 S2 5.5-litre N/A V10; Judd XV675/DB 3.4-litre N/A V8; Mazda MZR-R 2.0-litre T/C I4; Judd-BMW HK 3.6-litre N/A V8; Nissan VK45DE 4.5-litre N/A V8; Judd GV5 S2 5.0-litre N/A V10 mid-engined, longitudinally mounted
- Transmission: X-Trac 6-speed sequential manual
- Weight: 925kg (2039lbs)
- Tyres: Michelin; Dunlop; Continental; Kumho

Competition history
- Notable entrants: (France) Pescarolo Sport (France) OAK Racing (Switzerland) Morand Racing (Hong Kong) KCMG (Russia) G-Drive Racing (United States) Conquest Endurance (France) Larbre Compétition
- Notable drivers: (France) Emmanuel Collard (France) Jean-Christophe Boullion (France) Romain Dumas (Switzerland) Harold Primat (France) Christophe Tinseau (France) Benoît Tréluyer (Portugal) João Barbosa (Belgium) Vanina Ickx (China) Cheng Congfu (France) Bruce Jouanny (France) Julien Jousse (Denmark) David Heinemeier Hansson (France) Jean de Pourtales (Austria) Norbert Siedler (United Kingdom) Duncan Tappy (France) Jacques Nicolet (France) Pierre Ragues (France) Matthieu Lahaye (France) Guillaume Moreau (Austria) Dominik Kraihamer (Belgium) Bertrand Baguette (France) Olivier Pla (Switzerland) Natacha Gachnang (France) Franck Mailleux (Austria) Christian Klien (Japan) Shinji Nakano
- Debut: 2007 1000 km of Monza
- First win: 2010 1000 km of Zhuhai (ILMS)
- Last win: 2014 3 Hours of Sepang
- Last event: 2014 3 Hours of Sepang
Races	Wins	Podiums	Poles	F/Laps
118	23	76	18	3
- Teams' Championships: 4 (2010 ILMC, 2013 FIA WEC, 2013 Asian Le Mans Series, 2014 Asian Le Mans Series)
- Constructors' Championships: 1 (2010 LMS)
- Drivers' Championships: 4 (2011 LMS, 2013 FIA WEC, 2013 Asian Le Mans Series, 2014 Asian Le Mans Series)

The Pescarolo 01 was the first sports prototype racing car built entirely by French team Pescarolo Sport. It had been designed to meet the LMP1 and LMP2 regulations for Le Mans Prototypes in the Le Mans Series as well as at the 24 Hours of Le Mans, and replace Pescarolo's previous C60 chassis which had been heavily modified from cars purchased through Courage Compétition. The 01s debut was at the 2007 1000 km of Monza.

== Development ==
At the end of 2006, new regulations came into effect for the various series supported by the Automobile Club de l'Ouest (ACO). These regulations required extensive changes to the layout of a chassis, leaving many teams to purchase or build new cars as their current cars would be ineligible in 2007. Pescarolo Sport at the time was campaigning two Pescarolo C60s, cars which Pescarolo Sport had extensively modified from their origins as Courage C60s a few years prior. The C60s however did not meet the 2007 regulations, and team owner Henri Pescarolo chose to become a full constructor for the first time. Many features from the C60 were carried over in the design of the 01.

Unlike the C60, the 01 was intended to be not only used by the Pescarolo Sport team, but also to be sold to customers. In order to broaden their customer base, the 01 was designed to meet the regulations of both the LMP1 and LMP2 classes with minor variation required.

== Racing history ==
=== 2007 ===
As the first 01s were being completed, several teams announced their intent to purchase the chassis. British team Rollcentre Racing chose to re-enter the LMP1 category and campaign an 01-Judd alongside the two Pescarolo Sport cars. The German Kruse Motorsports team were the first to purchase an LMP2-spec car, using the smaller Judd V8 as a powerplant. Lister Cars also announced their intentions to purchase a chassis, which they would later modify, to replace their ineligible Storm LMP.

At the Pescarolo 01's debut in the Le Mans Series opener, the #16 car of Pescarolo Sport managed to finish in second place, between the two factory Peugeot diesels, while the #17 car finished fourth. The Rollcentre and Kruse cars also finished the event in points-earning positions.

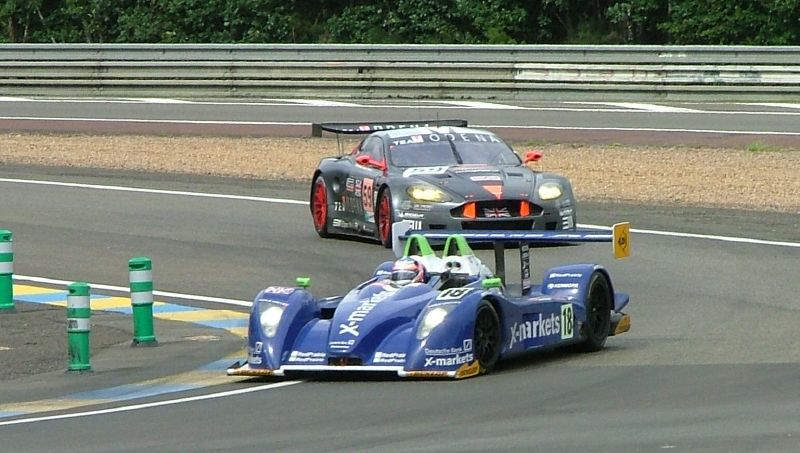
The #18 01 at the 2007 24 Hours of Le Mans

At the 2007 24 Hours of Le Mans, Pescarolo Sport was returning as the previous year's runner-up. All four 01s from the Le Mans Series were entered, and three of them were able to successfully reach the finish. The #16 Pescarolo of Emmanuel Collard, Jean-Christophe Boullion, and Romain Dumas was classified third, eleven laps behind the winning Audi, while Rollcentre Racing's car was a further eleven laps behind in fourth place. Pescarolo's #17 car finished well back in 13th, while Kruse's car suffered mechanical problems and retired in the first half of the event.

At the following race, the Nürburgring 1000 km, the works car managed a third place again, behind the two Peugeot 908 HDi FAP and for the Spa event (1000 km) on August 19 it was classified second in the race, just being beaten by the surviving Peugeot of Lamy-Sarrazin (the other one having not finished the race due to a rare mechanical failure), the other works Pescarolo ranking at 4th place.

For the British race (1000 km of Silverstone, 16 September) the Nr 16 car driven by Collard and Boullion again, ranked 2nd, still behind a Peugeot while the privateer Rollcentre car was third.

For the last race of the Le Mans Series (Mil Milhas do Brasil on November 10) on the Interlagos circuit, just one Pescarolo 01 was entered (the works car of Boullion-Collard-Primat) and it finished the race in 4th place behind the two Peugeot and the works Creation CA07.

Pescarolo's #16 good results allow Pescarolo Sport to secure second place in the LMP1 Teams Championship. Pescarolo's #17 car struggled to earn points and finished seventh in points, but the Rollcentre team were able to outperform the one factory Pescarolo and finish fourth in the championship. Kruse's season was cut short as a fire on board the team's transporter destroyed their car.

=== 2008 ===
For the 2008 season, five Pescarolo 01s would once again be entered in the Le Mans Series. Pescarolo Sport and Rollcentre Racing remained as they had the year before (Pescarolo with 01 and new 07 chassis), but two more 01s were entered by the French Saulnier Racing. The team, now owned by Jacques Nicolet, entered an 01 each in the LMP1 (which was the ex-works 05 chassis) and LMP2 (the brand new 06 chassis) classes.

In the LMP1 category, the four teams faced stiffer competition from not only the returning Peugeots, but also newcomers Audi. Pescarolo Sport finished on the podium twice in five races, once each for the #16 and #17 cars. It was the #16 car which once again led amongst Pescarolos in the Teams Championship, finishing in sixth place, while every other Pescarolo team managed to earn at least a point during the year. In LMP2, the Saulnier car using the latest V8 from Judd had a best finish of second in class at the 1000 km of Nürburgring and successfully finished the year fourth in the Teams Championship, the best non-Porsche in the field.

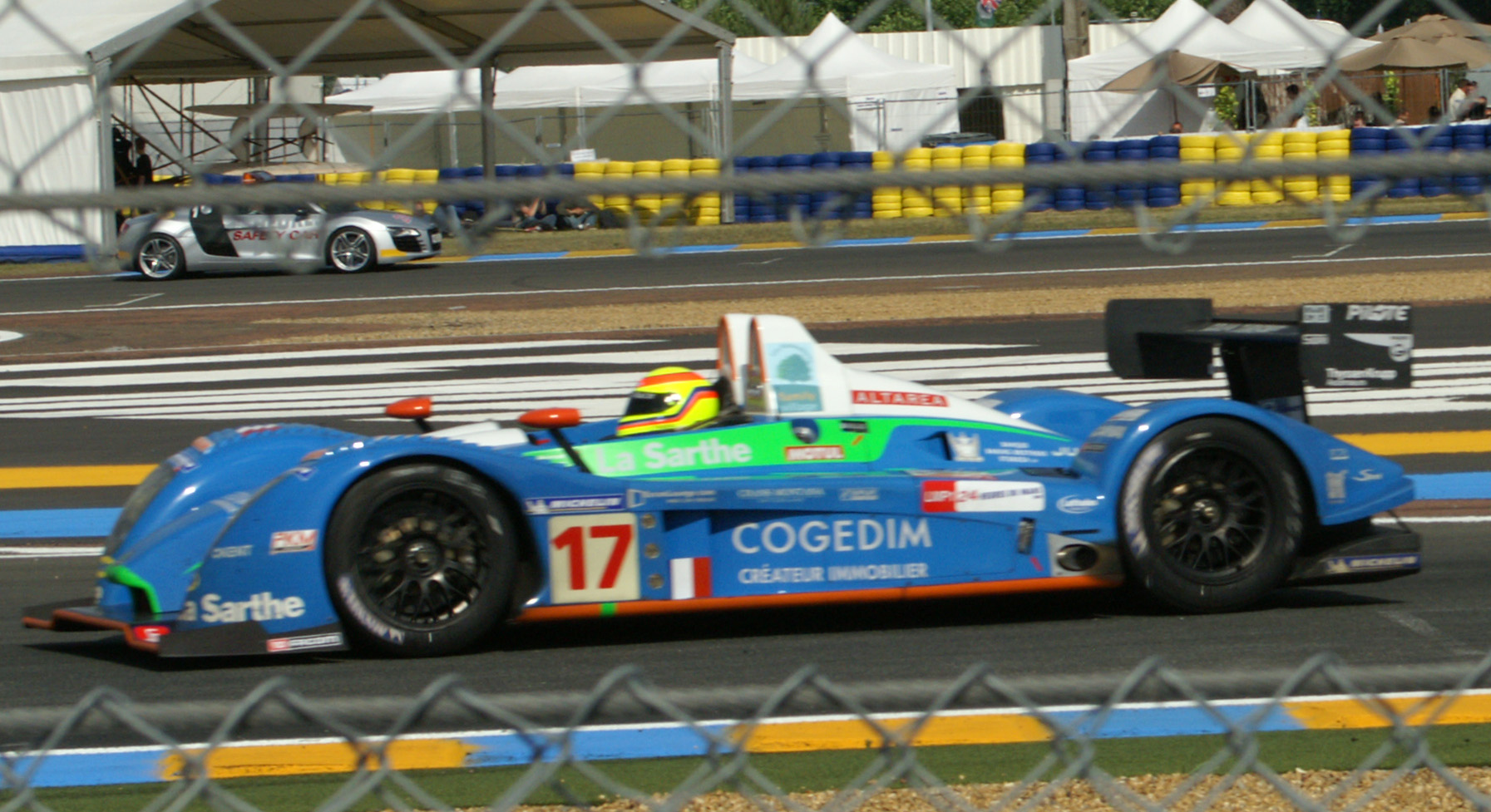
Christophe Tinseau piloting the #17 01 at the 2008 24 Hours of Le Mans

As in the previous year, the entire contingent of 01s competed in the 24 Hours of Le Mans, and once again nearly all were able to finish. #17 led the 01 field home in seventh place, the best finisher using petrol fuel. Rollcentre's race ended in eleventh place, while the LMP1 Saulnier entry survived for 26th. In LMP2, the Saulnier 01 was third in its class, 21 laps behind the winning Porsche, and ranked eighteenth in the overall standings. Only the #16 Pescarolo, which had earned a podium the previous year, was unable to complete the full race.

=== 2009 ===
In 2009, Pescarolo Sport and OAK Racing (the new name of Saulnier Racing), partnered with Mazda France, competed in the Le Mans Series season, each with two Evo chassis'. Pescarolo Sport #16 finished second in the LMP1 class Teams Championship thirteen points behind AMR Eastern Europe who ran a Lola-Aston Martin B09/60. They ran a #17 car for the first two-round before replacing it with the Peugeot. OAK Racing managed sixth and eighth in the LMP2 Teams Championship with eighth place car #35 earning a ten-point deduction. The car could have been placed in fourth position if the points deduction was not in place.

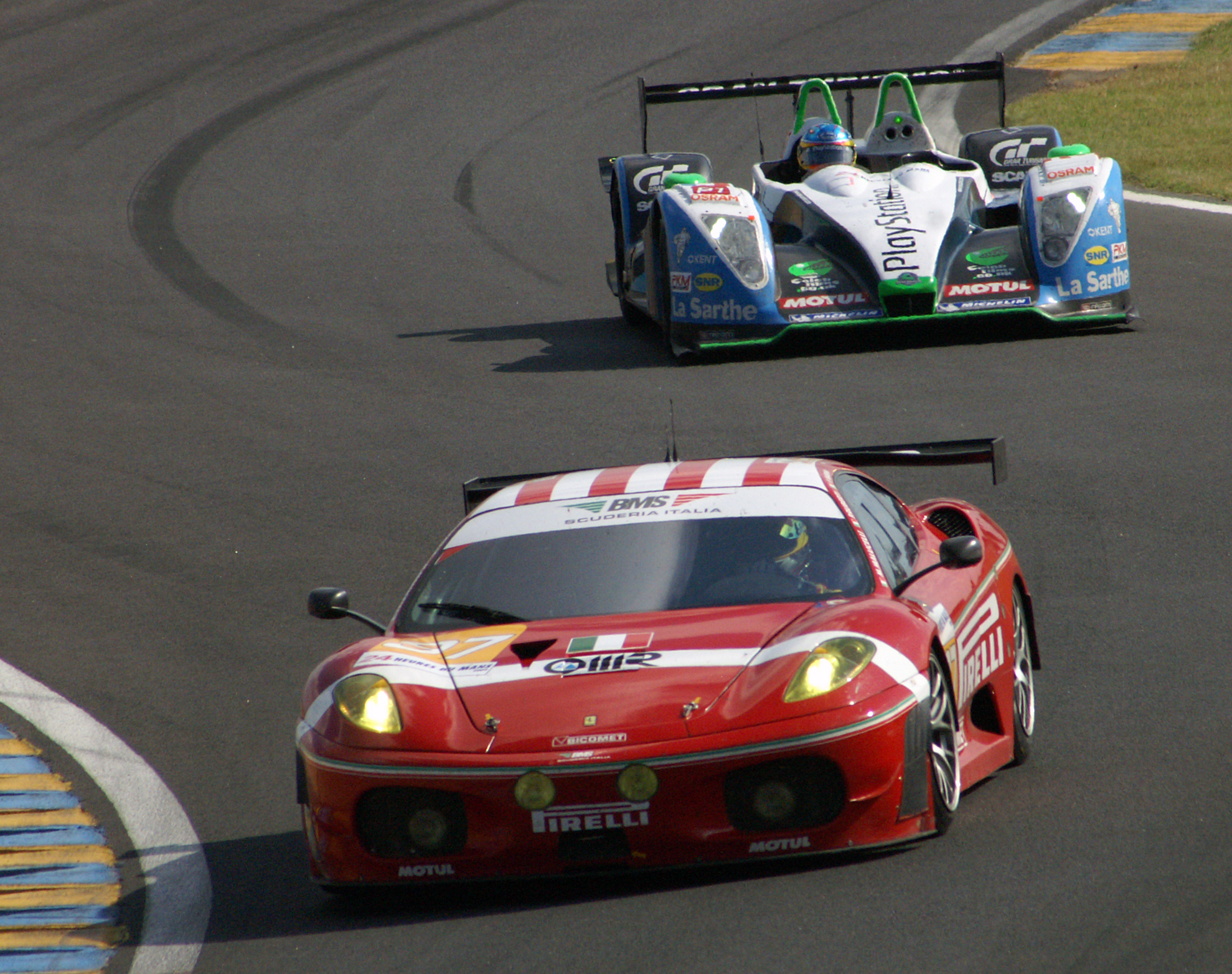
Bruce Jouanny chasing a Ferrari at the 2009 24 Hours of Le Mans

Pescarolo Sport competed at the 24 Hours of Le Mans with only one car being #16. Their #17 car was a Peugeot 908 HDi FAP. OAK Racing also campaigned their two LMP2-spec 01's at Le Mans. Pescarolo Sport managed to finish eighth overall and in class among tough opposition which included nine diesel-powered LMP1 cars as well as petrol opposition from Aston Martin Racing and Oreca. OAK Racing car #24 did well in LMP2 finishing third in class and 20th overall. Car #35 retired after 208 laps.

In December 2009, OAK Racing reached an agreement with Pescarolo Sport to take over the manufacturing side of its business. Consequently, the development and construction of the chassis, bodywork and spare parts of the Pescarolo prototypes was assumed by OAK Racing, as well as all commercial activities.

=== 2010 ===
In 2010, Pescarolo Sport did not race at all, the company being eventually disbanded on July 13 after having been in receivership in June. Though, OAK Racing, still partnered with Mazda France, competed in the Le Mans Series season, with two Evo chassis' in LMP2 category.

On 15 October 2010, during the asset sale of Pescarolo Sport, OAK Racing owner Jacques Nicolet and Prestige Racing’s Joël Rivière joined forces to purchase the lots, later presenting them to Henri Pescarolo and thus allowing him to revive his team.

=== 2011 ===
2011 saw the return of a Pescarolo works team under the form of a new team named Pescarolo Team, succeeding to Pescarolo Sport, being bankrupt in July 2010 after their financial difficulties. Pescarolo Team raced in the LMP1 class in the 2011 Le Mans Series season at the 2011 24 Hours of Le Mans. OAK Racing raced their own modified version of the 01 with two LMP1 cars and two LMP2 cars. The No. 35 OAK Pescarolo 01 finished third in the LMP2 class at the 2011 12 Hours of Sebring, the other two cars OAK Racing brought along (which were LMP1 cars) both retired, one of which led the race overall for a brief period after a full course caution. Pescarolo Team competed at the 6 Hours of Castellet with one car. Pescarolo's return was a dream comeback as they won overall. The grandfathered V10-powered car finished one lap ahead of second place car with Emmanuel Collard, Christophe Tinseau and Julien Jousse piloting the car.

=== 2012 ===
OAK Racing split the design, manufacturing, and sales divisions of the team into an independent company named Onroak Automotive and continued to run their modified version of the 01 in the LMP1 class for the upcoming 2012 FIA World Endurance Championship season. Their LMP2 car was renamed the Morgan LMP2 due to OAK's partnership with Morgan Motor Company. Pescarolo Team used the 01 for the last time at the 2012 12 Hours of Sebring (with a 5-liter engine, finishing 6th overall and 3rd among WEC LMP1 teams, behind the two Joest Racing Audi R18 TDIs) before being replaced by the Pescarolo 03, a modified version of Aston Martin Racing's AMR One. OAK Racing managed to finish in 2nd in the LMP2-class of Sebring, but experienced a turbulent season and finished 4th in the LMP2 Trophy.

=== 2013 ===
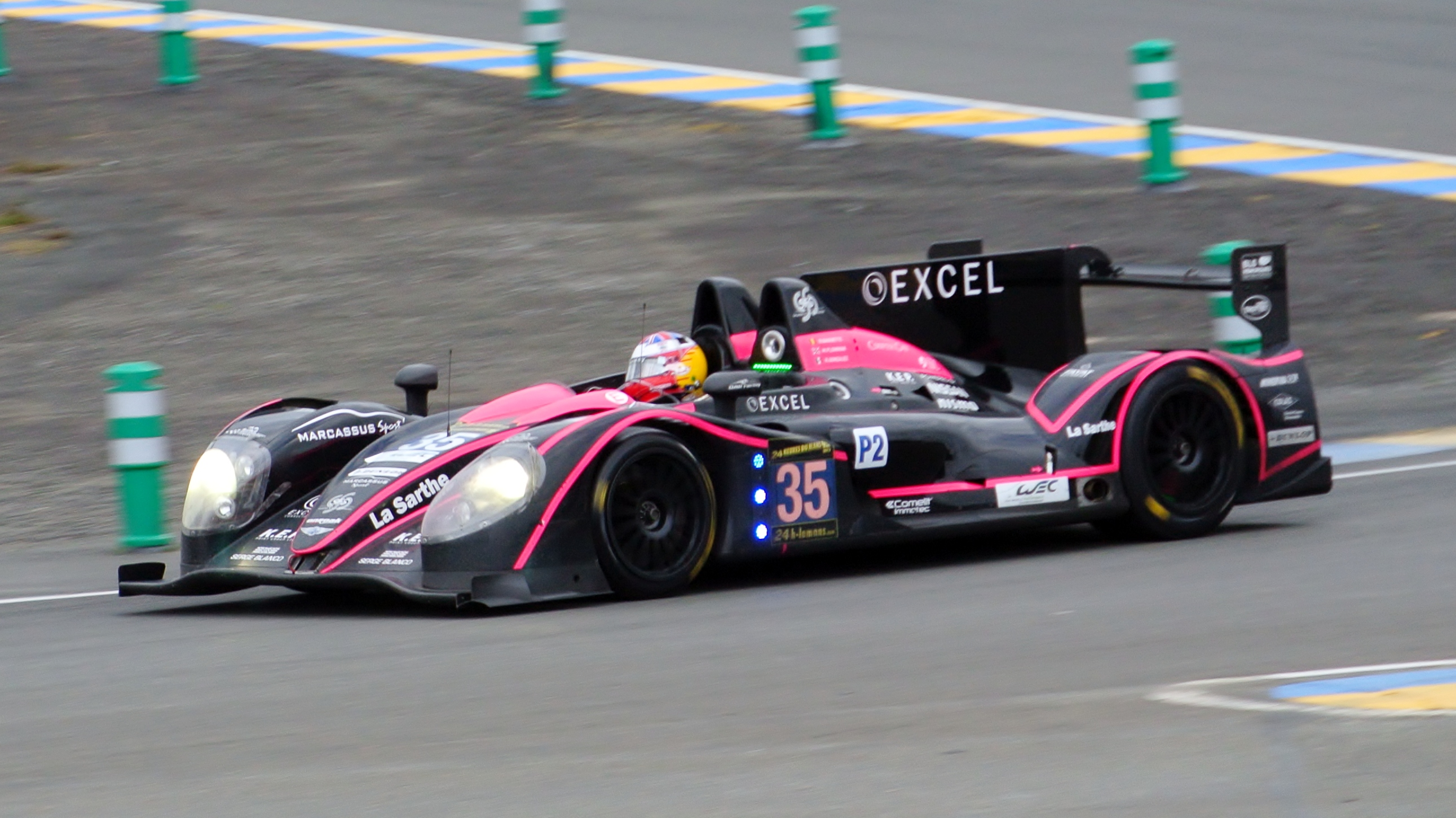
2013 Oak Racing Morgan-Nissan LMP2 car, 24 Hours of Le Mans winner.

The OAK-Pescarolo 01 was retired at the beginning of 2013. OAK Racing decided to concentrate on running the Morgan LMP2. The Morgan LMP2, equipped with a Nissan VK45DE engine, enjoyed great success in 2013, winning the LMP2-class of the 2013 24 Hours of Le Mans and both the Asian Le Mans Series and World Endurance Championship in the LMP2 category.

=== 2014 ===
For the 2014 season the Morgan LMP2 was campaigned for the World Endurance Championship under the title of G-Drive Racing. It was driven to first in class finishes at the 6 hours at Silverstone and 6 hours at Spa. It qualified for the 24 hours at Le Mans 13th overall, 4th in class, but did not finish. It was replaced with the newer Ligier JS P2 for the remainder of the season.

=== 2015 ===
In the 2015 24 Hours of Le Mans the Morgan Nissan and Morgan Evo SARD entered the race in the LMP2 class. The Morgan finished 19th overall and the Morgan Evo retired with engine problems.
