= Andrea Bertolini =

Italian professional racing driver

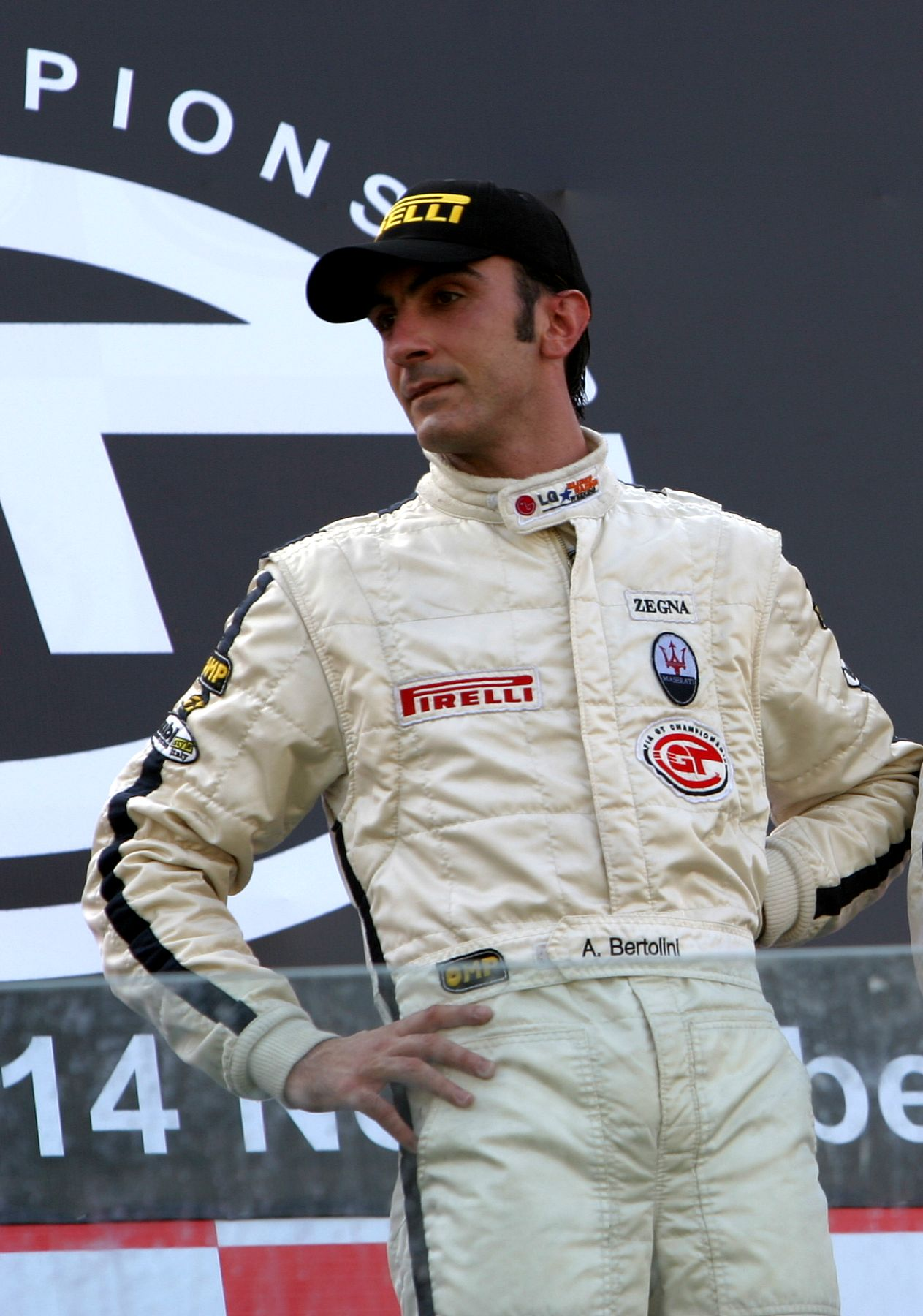
- Andrea Bertolini at Zhuhai International Circuit in 2004
- Nationality: (Italy) Italian
- Born: 1 December 1973 (age 52) Sassuolo, Italy

FIA World Endurance Championship career
- Debut season: 2012
- Current team: AF Corse
- Categorisation: FIA Platinum (until 2021); FIA Gold (2022–)
- Car number: 71

Previous series
- 2011 2010 2001-03, 05-09 2003, 05-07: Superstars Series; FIA GT1 World Championship; FIA GT Championship; American Le Mans Series

Championship titles
- 2011 2010 2006, 08-09: International Superstars Series; FIA GT1 World Championship; FIA GT Championship GT1

Andrea Bertolini (born 1 December 1973) is an Italian professional racing driver who drove for AF Corse in the FIA World Endurance Championship. He is the official test driver of the Maserati factory. Bertolini began racing at a young age, working as the youngest ever test driver for Ferrari at 19, followed by work in the experimental and development department. He also participated in the development of the Maserati MC12, in which he has enjoyed racing success winning for three times the FIA GT Championship in GT1 class, and also claiming the first edition of the FIA GT1 World Championship. He won the WEC championship in GTE Am category in 2015 and in the same year he won the 24H of Le Mans in the same class.

== Racing history ==
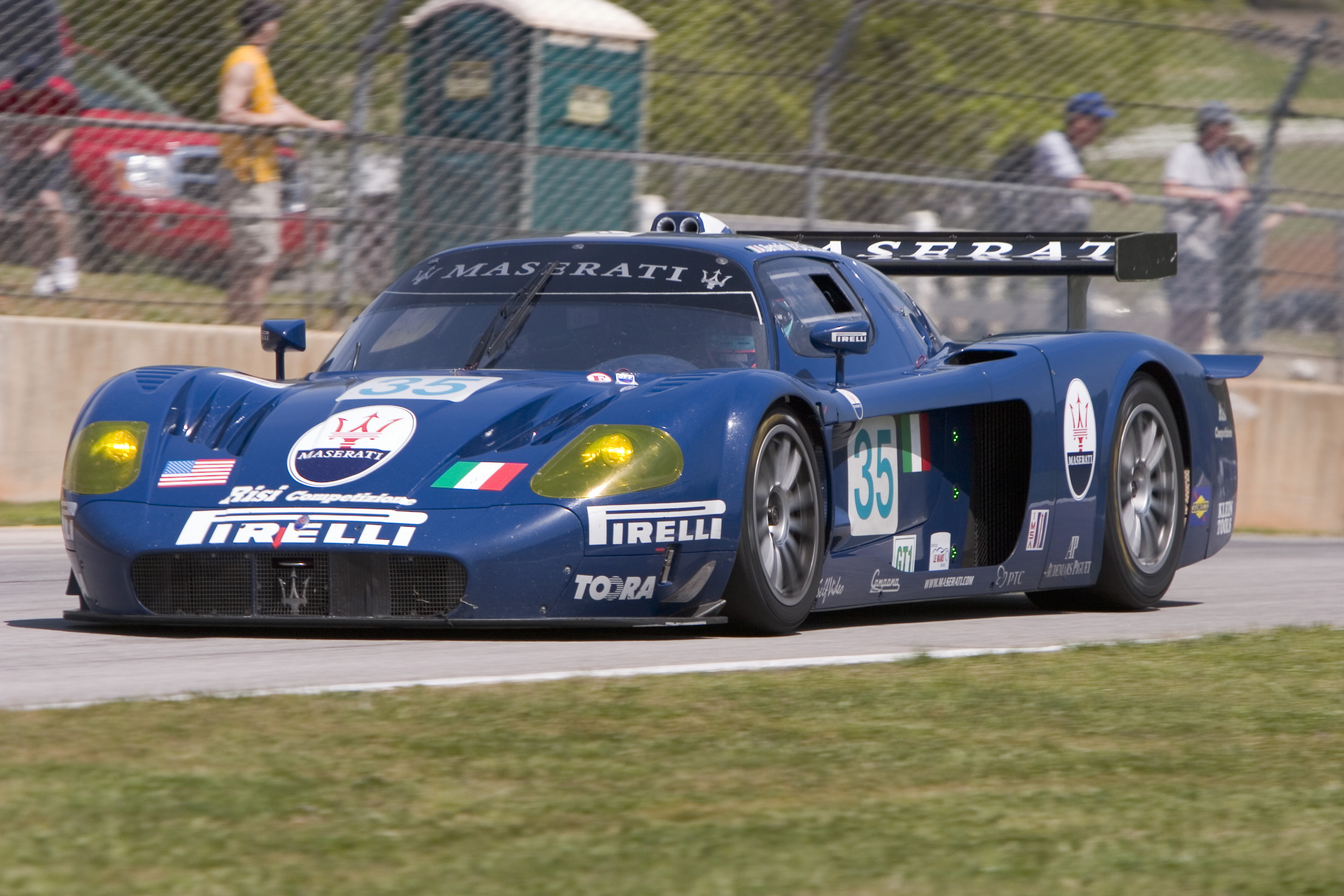
Andrea Bertolini driving an MC12 at Road Atlanta in the ALMS

Bertolini began racing karts at the age of 11. He came second in the Italian Championship, won championships at a national level, and went on to win the CIAK Cup and place second in the Italian 125 Championship in 2000. In 2001, he drove a Porsche 996 GT3-R for Art Engineering in the NGT class of the FIA GT. In 2002, he moved to JMB Racing driving a Ferrari 360 Modena and continued through 2003 finishing fourth.

In 2004, Bertolini moved to the Giesse Squadra Corse team, again driving a 360 Modena. Once again, he placed second overall, and was awarded the "Driver Performance of the Year". Part way through 2004, he was offered a position on the Maserati AF Corse team driving their new, GT1 class Maserati MC12, a car he had been involved in developing. He accepted, winning two races that year at Oschersleben, Germany and Zhuhai, China with his teammate, former Formula One driver, Mika Salo.

In 2005, Bertolini returned to JMB Racing, again driving an MC12. He finished the season tied fourth (with teammate Karl Wendlinger), within four points of first.

Bertolini also raced his MC12 in the American Le Mans Series (ALMS) in 2005 but without much success. He made no podium finishes and crashed out in the race at Mazda Raceway Laguna Seca.

For 2006 in the FIA GT, Bertolini moved to Vitaphone Racing Team where he again raced the MC12, with teammate Michael Bartels. Bartels and Bertolini finished first in the overall driver standings, and also their team to a 1st-place finish in the team standings.

Bertolini and Bartels also won the championship again driving the same Vitaphone Maserati in 2008, 2009 and 2010.

In 2011, Bertolini won the International Superstars Series driving a Maserati Quattroporte for Swiss Team.

Bertolini became the first person to drive Ferrari's new F1 Simulator at an opening ceremony held at the Italian teams' Maranello base.

For 2012, Bertolini will compete in the FIA World Endurance Championship, driving an AF Corse Ferrari 458 Italia GT2 with Olivier Beretta.

== See also ==
- Ferrari 360 Modena
- FIA GT
- Maserati MC12
- Porsche 996

== Racing record ==
=== Complete GT1 World Championship results ===
(key) (Races in bold indicate pole position) (Races in italics indicate fastest lap)

| Year | Team | Car | 1 | 2 | 3 | 4 | 5 | 6 | 7 | 8 | 9 | 10 | 11 | 12 | 13 | 14 | 15 | 16 | 17 | 18 | 19 | 20 | Pos | Points |
|---|---|---|---|---|---|---|---|---|---|---|---|---|---|---|---|---|---|---|---|---|---|---|---|---|
| 2010 | Vitaphone Racing Team | Maserati | ABU; QR; 3 | ABU; CR; 4 | SIL; QR; 3 | SIL; CR; 7 | BRN; QR; 1 | BRN; CR; 5 | PRI; QR; 1 | PRI; CR; 1 | SPA; QR; Ret | SPA; CR; 7 | NÜR; QR; 10 | NÜR; CR; 6 | ALG; QR; 2 | ALG; CR; 1 | NAV; QR; 7 | NAV; CR; 6 | INT; QR; 8 | INT; CR; 9 | SAN; QR; 12 | SAN; CR; 7 | **1st** | **138** |

=== Complete FIA World Endurance Championship results ===
(key) (Races in bold indicate pole position) (Races in italics indicate fastest lap)

| Year | Entrant | Class | Car | Engine | 1 | 2 | 3 | 4 | 5 | 6 | 7 | 8 | 9 | Rank | Points |
|---|---|---|---|---|---|---|---|---|---|---|---|---|---|---|---|
| 2012 | AF Corse | LMGTE Pro | Ferrari 458 Italia GT2 | Ferrari 4.5 L V8 | SEB; 1 | SPA; 4 | LMS; 4 | SIL; Ret | SÃO; 4 | BHR; 4 | FUJ; 4 | SHA; 3 | | 48th | 4 |
| 2013 | JMW Motorsport | LMGTE Pro | Ferrari 458 Italia GT2 | Ferrari 4.5 L V8 | SIL | SPA | LMS; 10 | SÃO | COA | FUJ | SHA | BHR | | NC‡ | 0‡ |
| 2014 | AF Corse | LMGTE Am | Ferrari 458 Italia GT2 | Ferrari 4.5 L V8 | SIL | SPA; 5 | | COA; 6 | FUJ; Ret | SHA | BHR; 2 | SÃO; 3 | | 11th | 51 |
| 2014 | SMP Racing | LMGTE Am | Ferrari 458 Italia GT2 | Ferrari 4.5 L V8 | | | LMS; Ret | | | | | | | NC‡ | 0‡ |
| 2015 | SMP Racing | LMGTE Am | Ferrari 458 Italia GT2 | Ferrari 4.5 L V8 | SIL; 3 | SPA; 3 | LMS; 1 | **NÜR**; 1 | COA; 1 | **FUJ**; 6 | SHA; 3 | BHR; 5 | | 1st | 165 |
| 2016 | AF Corse | LMGTE Pro | Ferrari 488 GTE | Ferrari F154CB 3.9 L Turbo V8 | SIL | SPA | LMS; Ret | NÜR | MEX | COA | FUJ | SHA | BHR | NC | 0 |

^{‡} As Bertolini was a guest driver, he was ineligible for championship points.

=== 24 Hours of Le Mans results ===
| Year | Team | Co-Drivers | Car | Class | Laps | Pos. | Class Pos. |
|---|---|---|---|---|---|---|---|
| 2012 | (Italy) AF Corse | (Monaco) Olivier Beretta (Italy) Marco Cioci | Ferrari 458 Italia GTC | GTE; Pro | 326 | 22nd | 4th |
| 2013 | (United Kingdom) JMW Motorsport | (Saudi Arabia) Abdulaziz al Faisal (United Arab Emirates) Khaled al Qubaisi | Ferrari 458 Italia GTC | GTE; Pro | 300 | 34th | 10th |
| 2014 | (Russia) SMP Racing | (Russia) Viktor Shaytar (Russia) Aleksey Basov | Ferrari 458 Italia GTC | GTE; Am | 196 | DNF | DNF |
| 2015 | (Russia) SMP Racing | (Russia) Viktor Shaytar (Russia) Aleksey Basov | Ferrari 458 Italia GTC | GTE; Am | 332 | 20th | **1st** |
| 2016 | (Italy) AF Corse | (United Kingdom) Sam Bird (Italy) Davide Rigon | Ferrari 488 GTE | GTE; Pro | 143 | DNF | DNF |
| 2017 | (Hong Kong) DH Racing | (Sweden) Niclas Jönsson (United States) Tracy Krohn | Ferrari 488 GTE | GTE; Am | 320 | 42nd | 13th |
| 2018 | (Philippines) Eurasia Motorsport | (Sweden) Niclas Jönsson (United States) Tracy Krohn | Ligier JS P217-Gibson | LMP2 | 334 | NC | NC |

=== Complete IMSA SportsCar Championship results ===
(key) (Races in bold indicate pole position) (Races in italics indicate fastest lap)

| Year | Team | Class | Make | Engine | 1 | 2 | 3 | 4 | 5 | 6 | 7 | 8 | 9 | 10 | 11 | 12 | Pos. | Points | Ref |
|---|---|---|---|---|---|---|---|---|---|---|---|---|---|---|---|---|---|---|---|
| 2014 | Krohn Racing | GTLM | Ferrari 458 Italia GT2 | Ferrari F142 4.5 V8 | DAY; 7 | SEB; 4 | LBH | LGA | WGL | MOS | IND | ELK | VIR | COA | PET; 9 | | 21st | 77 | |
| 2015 | Scuderia Corsa | GTD | Ferrari 458 Italia GT3 | Ferrari 4.5L V8 | DAY; 14† | | | | BEL | | | LIM | | | | | 59th | 1 | |
| 2015 | Risi Competizione | GTLM | Ferrari 458 Italia GT2 | Ferrari F142 4.5 V8 | | SEB; 2 | LGA | LGA | | WGL | MOS | | ELK | VIR | AUS | PET | 22nd | 33 | |
| 2016 | SMP Racing | GTLM | Ferrari 488 GTE | Ferrari F154CB 3.9 V8 | DAY; 10 | | | | | | | | | | | | 17th | 71 | |
| 2016 | Scuderia Corsa | GTLM | Ferrari 488 GTE | Ferrari F154CB 3.9 V8 | | SEB; 7 | LBH | LGA | WGL | MOS | LIM | ELK | VIR | AUS | PET; 8 | | 17th | 71 | |
| 2018 | Risi Competizione | GTLM | Ferrari 488 GTE | Ferrari F154CB 3.9 L Turbo V8 | DAY | SEB | LBH | MOH | WGL | MOS | LIM | ELK | VIR | LGA | PET; 9 | | 25th | 22 | |
| 2019 | Via Italia Racing | GTD | Ferrari 488 GT3 | Ferrari F154CB 3.9 L Turbo V8 | **DAY**; 8 | SEB | MDO | DET | WGL | MOS | LIM | ELK | VIR | LGA | PET | | 51st | 23 | |
| 2023 | Triarsi Competizione | GTD | Ferrari 296 GT3 | Ferrari 3.0 L Turbo V6 | DAY; 10 | SEB | LBH | LGA | WGL | MOS | LIM | ELK | VIR | IMS | PET | | 57th | 221 | |

^{†} Bertolini did not complete sufficient laps in order to score full points.

=== Complete European Le Mans Series results ===
(key) (Races in bold indicate pole position) (Races in italics indicate fastest lap)

| Year | Entrant | Class | Chassis | Engine | 1 | 2 | 3 | 4 | 5 | 6 | Rank | Points |
|---|---|---|---|---|---|---|---|---|---|---|---|---|
| 2016 | AT Racing | LMGTE | Ferrari 458 Italia GT2 | Ferrari 4.5 L V8 | SIL; EX | IMO; 2 | RBR; 1 | LEC; 1 | SPA; 1 | EST; Ret | 2nd | 93 |
| 2017 | Spirit of Race | LMGTE | Ferrari 488 GTE | Ferrari F154CB 3.9 L Turbo V8 | SIL; 6 | MNZ; 4 | **RBR**; 4 | LEC; 4 | SPA; 1 | ALG; Ret | 6th | 70 |
| 2018 | Krohn Racing | LMGTE | Ferrari 488 GTE | Ferrari F154CB 3.9 L Turbo V8 | LEC; 4 | MNZ; 6 | RBR; 5 | SIL; 6 | SPA; Ret | ALG; 5 | 8th | 48 |

=== Complete GT World Challenge Europe Sprint Cup results ===
(key) (Races in bold indicate pole position) (Races in italics indicate fastest lap)

| Year | Team | Car | Class | 1 | 2 | 3 | 4 | 5 | 6 | 7 | 8 | 9 | 10 | Pos. | Points |
|---|---|---|---|---|---|---|---|---|---|---|---|---|---|---|---|
| 2019 | AF Corse | Ferrari 488 GT3 | Pro-Am | **BRH**; **1** Ret | BRH; 2 Ret | MIS; 1; 11 | MIS; 2; 21 | ZAN; 1; 20 | ZAN; 2; 19 | NÜR; 1; 23 | NÜR; 2; 19 | HUN; 1; 23 | HUN; 2; 26 | 4th | 96 |
| 2020 | AF Corse | Ferrari 488 GT3 | Pro-Am | **MIS**; **1**; 13 | MIS; 2; 13 | **MIS**; **3**; 13 | MAG; 1; 18 | MAG; 2; 15 | **ZAN**; **1**; 16 | ZAN; 2; 13 | CAT; 1; 16 | CAT; 2; 15 | CAT; 3; 12 | 2nd | 117.5 |
| 2021 | AF Corse | Ferrari 488 GT3 Evo 2020 | Pro-Am | MAG; 1; 18 | MAG; 2; 19 | ZAN; 1; 21 | ZAN; 2; 22 | **MIS**; **1**; 25 | MIS; 2; 25 | BRH; 1; 22 | BRH; 2; 26 | VAL; 1; 19 | VAL; 2; 23 | 3rd | 107 |
| 2022 | AF Corse | Ferrari 488 GT3 Evo 2020 | Pro-Am | **BRH**; **1**; 18 | BRH; 2; 19 | MAG; 1; 23 | MAG; 2 Ret | ZAN; 1; 16 | ZAN; 2; 18 | MIS; 1; 18 | MIS; 2; 18 | VAL; 1; 18 | VAL; 2; 24 | 3rd | 95 |
| 2023 | AF Corse | Ferrari 296 GT3 | Bronze | BRH; 1 | BRH; 2 | MIS; 1; 35 | MIS; 2; 30 | HOC; 1 Ret | HOC; 2; 27 | VAL; 1 | VAL; 2 | ZAN; 1 | ZAN; 2 | 13th | 9.5 |

Sporting positions
| Preceded by Gabriele Gardel | FIA GT Championship; Champion; 2006; With: Michael Bartels | Succeeded by Thomas Biagi |
| Preceded by Thomas Biagi | FIA GT Championship; Champion; 2008-2009; With: Michael Bartels | Succeeded by None (Series ended) |
| Preceded by Inaugural | FIA GT1 World Championship; Champion; 2010; With: Michael Bartels | Succeeded by Michael Krumm; Lucas Luhr |
| Preceded by Thomas Biagi | International Superstars Series; Champion; 2011 | Succeeded by Johan Kristoffersson |
| Preceded by Inaugural | Asian Le Mans Series; GTC Champion; 2013; With: Michele Rugolo & Steve Wyatt | Succeeded by None (Class discontinued) |
| Preceded by David Heinemeier Hansson; Kristian Poulsen | FIA Endurance Trophy for LMGTE Am Drivers; 2015; With: Aleksey Basov & Viktor Shaitar | Succeeded by Emmanuel Collard; François Perrodo; Rui Águas |
| Preceded by Markus Winkelhock; Nyls Stievenart | Blancpain GT Series; Pro-Am Champion; 2019; With: Louis Machiels | Succeeded by Eddie Cheever III; Chris Froggatt (GT World Challenge Europe) |
