= 2014 SportsCar Grand Prix =

Canadian Tire Motorsport Park

The 2014 Mobil 1 SportsCar Grand Prix presented by Hawk Performance was a sports car racing event held at Canadian Tire Motorsport Park near Bowmanville, Ontario on July 13, 2014. The race was the eighth round of the inaugural Tudor United SportsCar Championship, replacing the former American Le Mans Series that previously held the Grand Prix since 1999. The race marked the 29th IMSA sanctioned sports car race held at the facility. Daytona Prototypes were introduced to the race for the first time as part of the development of the United SportsCar Championship.

The race was won by OAK Racing's Morgan LMP2 - Nissan driven by Olivier Pla and Gustavo Yacamán, ahead of the Spirit of Daytona Racing's Corvette DP and Wayne Taylor Racing's Corvette DP. The GTLM class winners were Corvette Racing in their fourth straight victory of the season, with drivers Jan Magnussen and Antonio García. Riley Motorsports also earned the first ever win for the SRT Viper GT3-R in GTD with Jeroen Bleekemolen and Ben Keating.

== Background ==
=== Preview ===
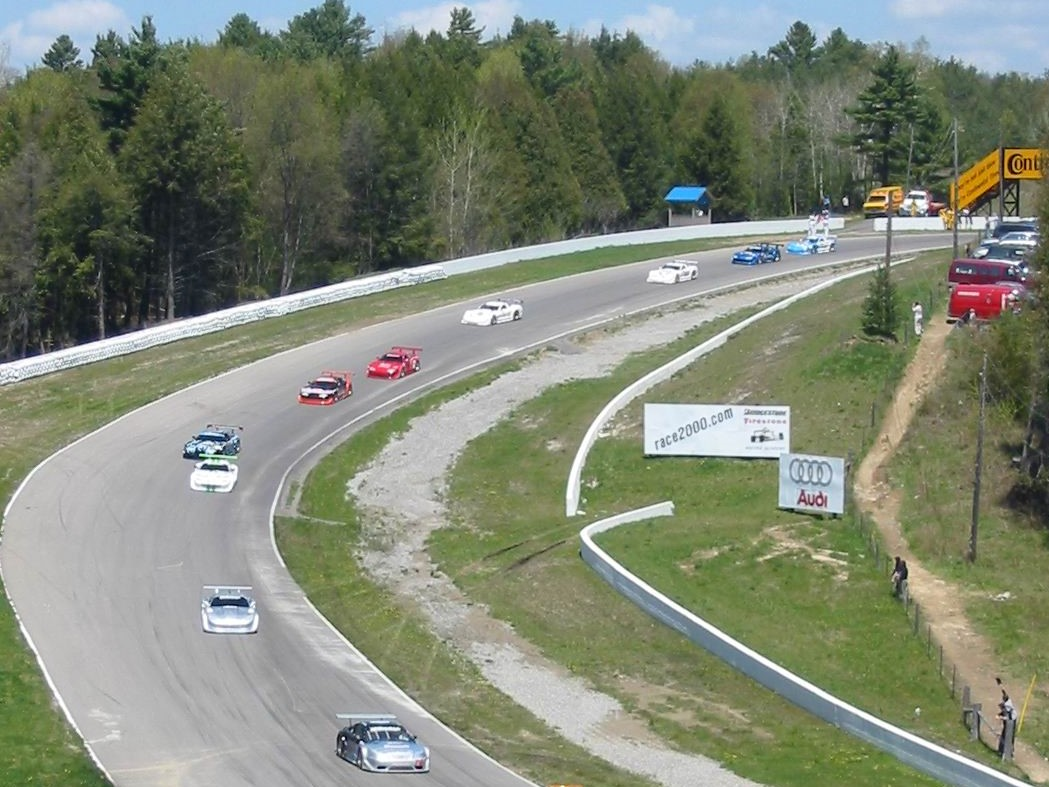
Canadian Tire Motorsports Park, where the race was held.

International Motor Sports Association (IMSA) president Scott Atherton confirmed that the race was part of the 2014 United SportsCar Championship schedule in September 2013. It was the first year that the race was part of the series calendar, and the thirty-third annual running of the race. The race was the eighth of 2014's thirteen scheduled IMSA automobile endurance races, and it was the fifth round not held as part of the North American Endurance Cup. The race was held at the ten-turn 2.459 mi (3.957 km) Canadian Tire Motorsports Park in Bowmanville, Ontario, Canada on July 13, 2014.

== Qualifying ==
=== Qualifying results ===
Pole positions in each class are indicated in bold and with ‡.

Pos.	Class	No.	Entry	Driver	Time	Gap	Grid
1	**P**	**42**	**(France) OAK Racing**	**(Colombia) Gustavo Yacamán**	**1:09.167**	—	1‡
2	P	1	(United States) Extreme Speed Motorsports	(United Kingdom) Ryan Dalziel	1:09.456	+0.289	2
3	P	90	(United States) Spirit of Daytona Racing	(United Kingdom) Richard Westbrook	1:09.642	+0.475	3
4	P	2	(United States) Extreme Speed Motorsports	(United States) Johannes van Overbeek	1:10.136	+0.969	4
5	P	5	(United States) Action Express Racing	(Brazil) Christian Fittipaldi	1:10.298	+1.131	5
6	P	10	(United States) Wayne Taylor Racing	(United States) Ricky Taylor	1:10.336	+1.169	6
7	P	01	(United States) Chip Ganassi Racing with Felix Sabates	(Mexico) Memo Rojas	1:10.433	+1.266	7
8	P	60	(United States) Michael Shank Racing with Curb/Agajanian	(Brazil) Oswaldo Negri	1:11.339	+2.172	8
9	P	07	(United States) Speedsource	(United States) Tristan Nunez	1:12.829	+3.662	9
10	P	70	(United States) Speedsource	(United States) Tom Long	1:14.700	+5.533	10
11	**GTLM**	**93**	**(United States) SRT Motorsports**	**(Canada) Kuno Wittmer**	**1:15.206**	**+6.039**	11‡
12	GTLM	3	(United States) Corvette Racing	(Spain) Antonio García	1:15.278	+6.111	12
13	GTLM	17	(United States) Team Falken Tire	(Germany) Wolf Henzler	1:15.368	+6.201	13
14	GTLM	4	(United States) Corvette Racing	(United Kingdom) Oliver Gavin	1:15.470	+6.303	14
15	GTLM	56	(United States) BMW Team RLL	(Germany) Dirk Müller	1:15.497	+6.330	15
16	GTLM	911	(United States) Porsche North America	(United Kingdom) Nick Tandy	1:15.724	+6.557	16
17	GTLM	91	(United States) SRT Motorsports	(Germany) Dominik Farnbacher	1:15.728	+6.561	17
18	GTLM	912	(United States) Porsche North America	(United States) Patrick Long	1:15.942	+6.775	18
19	GTLM	62	(United States) Risi Competizione	(Germany) Pierre Kaffer	1:16.340	+7.173	19
20	GTLM	55	(United States) BMW Team RLL	(United Kingdom) Andy Priaulx	1:16.395	+7.228	20
21	**GTD**	**33**	**(United States) Riley Motorsports**	**(Netherlands) Jeroen Bleekemolen**	**1:19.004**	**+9.837**	21‡
22	GTD	45	(United States) Flying Lizard Motorsports	(United States) Spencer Pumpelly	1:19.159	+9.992	22
23	GTD	94	(United States) Turner Motorsport	(United States) Dane Cameron	1:19.175	+10.008	23
24	GTD	23	(United States) Team Seattle/Alex Job Racing	(Germany) Mario Farnbacher	1:19.213	+10.046	24
25	GTD	35	(United States) Flying Lizard Motorsports	(South Africa) Dion von Moltke	1:19.223	+10.056	25
26	GTD	58	(United States) Snow Racing	(Belgium) Jan Heylen	1:19.249	+10.082	26
27	GTD	22	(United States) Alex Job Racing	(United States) Leh Keen	1:19.356	+10.189	27
28	GTD	007	(United States) TRG-AMR	(Australia) James Davison	1:19.358	+10.191	28
29	GTD	73	(United States) Park Place Motorsports	(France) Kévin Estre	1:19.532	+10.365	29
30	GTD	48	(United States) Paul Miller Racing	(Germany) Christopher Haase	1:19.555	+10.388	30
31	GTD	555	(Canada) AIM Autosport	(United States) Townsend Bell	1:19.684	+10.517	31
32	GTD	44	(United States) Magnus Racing	(United States) Andy Lally	1:19.763	+10.596	32
33	GTD	63	(United States) Scuderia Corsa	(Italy) Alessandro Balzan	1:19.793	+10.626	33
34	GTD	27	(United States) Dempsey Racing	(United States) Andrew Davis	1:19.806	+10.639	34
35	GTD	81	(United States) GB Autosport	(Republic of Ireland) Damien Faulkner	1:20.062	+10.895	35
36	GTD	18	(Belgium) Mühlner Motorsports America	(Canada) Mark Thomas	1:20.809	+11.642	36
37	GTD	46	(United States) Fall-Line Motorsports	(United States) Charles Espenlaub	1:21.050	+11.883	37
38	P	0	(United States) DeltaWing Racing Cars	None	No Time Established		38
39	P	31	(United States) Marsh Racing	None	No Time Established		39
40	GTD	19	(Belgium) Mühlner Motorsports America	None	No Time Established		40

== Race ==
=== Race result ===
Final race classification
Pos	Class	No.	Team	Drivers	Chassis	Tire	Laps
Pos	Class	No.	Team	Drivers	Engine	Tire	Laps
1	P	42	(France) OAK Racing	(France) Olivier Pla (Colombia) Gustavo Yacamán	Morgan LMP2	C	133
1	P	42	(France) OAK Racing	(France) Olivier Pla (Colombia) Gustavo Yacamán	Nissan VK45DE 4.5 L V8	C	133
2	P	90	(United States) Spirit of Daytona Racing	(Canada) Michael Valiante (United Kingdom) Richard Westbrook	Coyote Corvette DP	C	133
2	P	90	(United States) Spirit of Daytona Racing	(Canada) Michael Valiante (United Kingdom) Richard Westbrook	Chevrolet LS9 5.5 L V8	C	133
3	P	10	(United States) Wayne Taylor Racing	(United States) Ricky Taylor (United States) Jordan Taylor	Dallara Corvette DP	C	133
3	P	10	(United States) Wayne Taylor Racing	(United States) Ricky Taylor (United States) Jordan Taylor	Chevrolet LS9 5.5 L V8	C	133
4	P	5	(United States) Action Express Racing	(Portugal) João Barbosa (Brazil) Christian Fittipaldi	Coyote Corvette DP	C	133
4	P	5	(United States) Action Express Racing	(Portugal) João Barbosa (Brazil) Christian Fittipaldi	Chevrolet LS9 5.5 L V8	C	133
5	P	60	(United States) Michael Shank Racing with Curb/Agajanian	(United States) John Pew (Brazil) Oswaldo Negri	Riley MkXXVI	C	131
5	P	60	(United States) Michael Shank Racing with Curb/Agajanian	(United States) John Pew (Brazil) Oswaldo Negri	Ford EcoBoost 3.5 L Turbo V6	C	131
6	GTLM	3	(United States) Corvette Racing	(Denmark) Jan Magnussen (Spain) Antonio García	Chevrolet Corvette C7.R	M	127
6	GTLM	3	(United States) Corvette Racing	(Denmark) Jan Magnussen (Spain) Antonio García	Chevrolet LT5.5 5.5 L V8	M	127
7	GTLM	93	(United States) SRT Motorsports	(United States) Jonathan Bomarito (Canada) Kuno Wittmer	SRT Viper GTS-R	M	127
7	GTLM	93	(United States) SRT Motorsports	(United States) Jonathan Bomarito (Canada) Kuno Wittmer	SRT 8.0 L V10	M	127
8	P	07	(United States) SpeedSource	(United States) Tristan Nunez (United States) Joel Miller	Mazda Prototype	C	127
8	P	07	(United States) SpeedSource	(United States) Tristan Nunez (United States) Joel Miller	Mazda Skyactiv-D 2.2 L Turbo I4 (Diesel)	C	127
9	GTLM	91	(United States) SRT Motorsports	(Germany) Dominik Farnbacher (Belgium) Marc Goossens	SRT Viper GTS-R	M	127
9	GTLM	91	(United States) SRT Motorsports	(Germany) Dominik Farnbacher (Belgium) Marc Goossens	SRT 8.0 L V10	M	127
10	GTLM	56	(United States) BMW Team RLL	(United States) John Edwards (Germany) Dirk Müller	BMW Z4 GTE	M	126
10	GTLM	56	(United States) BMW Team RLL	(United States) John Edwards (Germany) Dirk Müller	BMW 4.4 L V8	M	126
11	GTLM	911	(United States) Porsche North America	(United Kingdom) Nick Tandy (Austria) Richard Lietz	Porsche 911 RSR	M	126
11	GTLM	911	(United States) Porsche North America	(United Kingdom) Nick Tandy (Austria) Richard Lietz	Porsche 4.0 L Flat-6	M	126
12	GTLM	55	(United States) BMW Team RLL	(United States) Bill Auberlen (United Kingdom) Andy Priaulx	BMW Z4 GTE	M	126
12	GTLM	55	(United States) BMW Team RLL	(United States) Bill Auberlen (United Kingdom) Andy Priaulx	BMW 4.4 L V8	M	126
13	GTLM	4	(United States) Corvette Racing	(United States) Tommy Milner (United Kingdom) Oliver Gavin	Chevrolet Corvette C7.R	M	126
13	GTLM	4	(United States) Corvette Racing	(United States) Tommy Milner (United Kingdom) Oliver Gavin	Chevrolet LT5.5 5.5 L V8	M	126
14	GTLM	17	(United States) Team Falken Tire	(United States) Bryan Sellers (Germany) Wolf Henzler	Porsche 911 RSR	F	126
14	GTLM	17	(United States) Team Falken Tire	(United States) Bryan Sellers (Germany) Wolf Henzler	Porsche 4.0 L Flat-6	F	126
15	GTLM	912	(United States) Porsche North America	(United States) Patrick Long (Denmark) Michael Christensen	Porsche 911 RSR	M	126
15	GTLM	912	(United States) Porsche North America	(United States) Patrick Long (Denmark) Michael Christensen	Porsche 4.0 L Flat-6	M	126
16	GTLM	62	(United States) Risi Competizione	(Italy) Giancarlo Fisichella (Germany) Pierre Kaffer	Ferrari 458 Italia GT2	M	125
16	GTLM	62	(United States) Risi Competizione	(Italy) Giancarlo Fisichella (Germany) Pierre Kaffer	Ferrari 4.5 L V8	M	125
17	GTD	33	(United States) Riley Motorsports	(Netherlands) Jeroen Bleekemolen (United States) Ben Keating	SRT Viper GT3-R	C	121
17	GTD	33	(United States) Riley Motorsports	(Netherlands) Jeroen Bleekemolen (United States) Ben Keating	SRT 8.0 L V10	C	121
18	GTD	73	(United States) Park Place Motorsports	(France) Kévin Estre (United States) Patrick Lindsey	Porsche 911 GT America	C	121
18	GTD	73	(United States) Park Place Motorsports	(France) Kévin Estre (United States) Patrick Lindsey	Porsche 4.0 L Flat-6	C	121
19	GTD	94	(United States) Turner Motorsport	(United States) Dane Cameron (Finland) Markus Palttala	BMW Z4 GT3	C	120
19	GTD	94	(United States) Turner Motorsport	(United States) Dane Cameron (Finland) Markus Palttala	BMW 4.4 L V8	C	120
20	GTD	81	(United States) GB Autosport	(United Kingdom) Ben Barker (Republic of Ireland) Damien Faulkner	Porsche 911 GT America	C	120
20	GTD	81	(United States) GB Autosport	(United Kingdom) Ben Barker (Republic of Ireland) Damien Faulkner	Porsche 4.0 L Flat-6	C	120
21	GTD	22	(United States) Alex Job Racing	(United States) Cooper MacNeil (United States) Leh Keen	Porsche 911 GT America	C	120
21	GTD	22	(United States) Alex Job Racing	(United States) Cooper MacNeil (United States) Leh Keen	Porsche 4.0 L Flat-6	C	120
22	GTD	23	(United States) Team Seattle/Alex Job Racing	(United States) Ian James (Germany) Mario Farnbacher	Porsche 911 GT America	C	120
22	GTD	23	(United States) Team Seattle/Alex Job Racing	(United States) Ian James (Germany) Mario Farnbacher	Porsche 4.0 L Flat-6	C	120
23	GTD	58	(United States) Snow Racing	(Belgium) Jan Heylen (United States) Madison Snow	Porsche 911 GT America	C	120
23	GTD	58	(United States) Snow Racing	(Belgium) Jan Heylen (United States) Madison Snow	Porsche 4.0 L Flat-6	C	120
24	GTD	48	(United States) Paul Miller Racing	(United States) Bryce Miller (Germany) Christopher Haase	Audi R8 LMS	C	119
24	GTD	48	(United States) Paul Miller Racing	(United States) Bryce Miller (Germany) Christopher Haase	Audi 5.2 L V10	C	119
25	GTD	44	(United States) Magnus Racing	(United States) Andy Lally (United States) John Potter	Porsche 911 GT America	C	119
25	GTD	44	(United States) Magnus Racing	(United States) Andy Lally (United States) John Potter	Porsche 4.0 L Flat-6	C	119
26	GTD	45	(United States) Flying Lizard Motorsports	(United States) Spencer Pumpelly (United States) Dion von Moltke (Venezuela) Nelson Canache, Jr.	Audi R8 LMS	C	119
26	GTD	45	(United States) Flying Lizard Motorsports	(United States) Spencer Pumpelly (United States) Dion von Moltke (Venezuela) Nelson Canache, Jr.	Audi 5.2 L V10	C	119
27	GTD	27	(United States) Dempsey Racing	(United States) Patrick Dempsey (United States) Andrew Davis	Porsche 911 GT America	C	119
27	GTD	27	(United States) Dempsey Racing	(United States) Patrick Dempsey (United States) Andrew Davis	Porsche 4.0 L Flat-6	C	119
28	GTD	007	(United States) TRG-AMR	(Australia) James Davison (United States) Al Carter	Aston Martin V12 Vantage GT3	C	118
28	GTD	007	(United States) TRG-AMR	(Australia) James Davison (United States) Al Carter	Aston Martin 6.0 L V12	C	118
29	GTD	555	(Canada) AIM Autosport	(United States) Bill Sweedler (United States) Townsend Bell	Ferrari 458 Italia GT3	C	118
29	GTD	555	(Canada) AIM Autosport	(United States) Bill Sweedler (United States) Townsend Bell	Ferrari 4.5 L V8	C	118
30	GTD	35	(United States) Flying Lizard Motorsports	(United States) Seth Neiman (United States) Dion von Moltke (United States) Spencer Pumpelly	Audi R8 LMS	C	118
30	GTD	35	(United States) Flying Lizard Motorsports	(United States) Seth Neiman (United States) Dion von Moltke (United States) Spencer Pumpelly	Audi 5.2 L V10	C	118
31	GTD	18	(United States) Mühlner Motorsports America	(Canada) Mark Thomas (Canada) Chris Green	Porsche 911 GT America	C	117
31	GTD	18	(United States) Mühlner Motorsports America	(Canada) Mark Thomas (Canada) Chris Green	Porsche 4.0 L Flat-6	C	117
32	GTD	46	(United States) Fall-Line Motorsports	(United States) Charles Espenlaub (United States) Charlie Putnam	Audi R8 LMS	C	117
32	GTD	46	(United States) Fall-Line Motorsports	(United States) Charles Espenlaub (United States) Charlie Putnam	Audi 5.2 L V10	C	117
33 DNF	P	2	(United States) Extreme Speed Motorsports	(United States) Ed Brown (United States) Johannes van Overbeek	HPD ARX-03b	C	92
33 DNF	P	2	(United States) Extreme Speed Motorsports	(United States) Ed Brown (United States) Johannes van Overbeek	Honda HR28TT 2.8 L Turbo V6	C	92
34 DNF	P	1	(United States) Extreme Speed Motorsports	(United States) Scott Sharp (United Kingdom) Ryan Dalziel	HPD ARX-03b	C	86
34 DNF	P	1	(United States) Extreme Speed Motorsports	(United States) Scott Sharp (United Kingdom) Ryan Dalziel	Honda HR28TT 2.8 L Turbo V6	C	86
35 DNF	P	01	(United States) Chip Ganassi Racing with Felix Sabates	(United States) Scott Pruett (Mexico) Memo Rojas	Riley MkXXVI	C	46
35 DNF	P	01	(United States) Chip Ganassi Racing with Felix Sabates	(United States) Scott Pruett (Mexico) Memo Rojas	Ford EcoBoost 3.5 L Turbo V6	C	46
36 DNF	GTD	63	(United States) Scuderia Corsa	(United States) Jeff Westphal (Italy) Alessandro Balzan	Ferrari 458 Italia GT3	C	44
36 DNF	GTD	63	(United States) Scuderia Corsa	(United States) Jeff Westphal (Italy) Alessandro Balzan	Ferrari 4.5 L V8	C	44
37 DNF	P	70	(United States) SpeedSource	(Canada) Sylvain Tremblay (United States) Tom Long	Mazda Prototype	C	23
37 DNF	P	70	(United States) SpeedSource	(Canada) Sylvain Tremblay (United States) Tom Long	Mazda Skyactiv-D 2.2 L Turbo I4 (Diesel)	C	23
38 DNS	P	0	(United States) DeltaWing Racing Cars	(United Kingdom) Andy Meyrick (United Kingdom) Katherine Legge	DeltaWing DWC13	C	–
38 DNS	P	0	(United States) DeltaWing Racing Cars	(United Kingdom) Andy Meyrick (United Kingdom) Katherine Legge	Élan 1.9 L Turbo I4	C	–
39 DNS	P	31	(United States) Marsh Racing	(United States) Eric Curran (United States) Boris Said	Coyote Corvette DP	C	–
39 DNS	P	31	(United States) Marsh Racing	(United States) Eric Curran (United States) Boris Said	Chevrolet LS9 5.5 L V8	C	–
OFFICIAL RACE REPORT

Tyre manufacturers
Key
Symbol	Tyre manufacturer
C	Continental
M	Michelin
F	Falken Tire

United SportsCar Championship
Previous race: 6 Hours of The Glen	2014 season	Next race: Brickyard Grand Prix
