= 2014 United SportsCar Championship =

44th season of the racing series organized by IMSA

The 2014 United SportsCar Championship (known for sponsorship reasons as the 2014 Tudor United SportsCar Championship) was the inaugural season of the International Motor Sports Association's new series created out of a merger of the Rolex Sports Car Series and the American Le Mans Series and the first to be held under the name as the United SportsCar Championship. It began with the 24 Hours of Daytona, the first time since the 1997 IMSA GT Championship season that IMSA sanctioned an event at Daytona International Speedway on 25 January and ended on 4 October at Petit Le Mans. It was the 44th overall season of IMSA GT championship racing tracing its lineage to the 1971 IMSA GT Championship.

== Classes ==
The class structures were revealed on March 14 and are as follows:

- Prototype (P) – a merger of the RSCS Daytona Prototypes, the ALMS LMP2 prototypes, and the experimental DeltaWing. The ALMS LMP1 class was discontinued.
- Prototype Challenge (PC) – the ALMS spec Corvette-engined Oreca prototypes.
- GT Le Mans (GTLM) – grand touring cars from the ALMS.
- GT Daytona (GTD) – a merger of GT and GX cars from the RSCS and the ALMS GT Challenge Porsche GT3s.

=== Car capacities ===
Due to the expectation of a large number of entries for the series, IMSA announced preliminary car capacities for each class on October 11, 2013. They noted, however, that they are subject to change based on factors such as the number of full-season entries in each class.

- Prototype – Limited to 19 entries with the exceptions of Sebring, Long Beach, Laguna Seca, Detroit, and Indianapolis, wherein 20 entries would be allowed.
- Prototype Challenge – Limited to 10 entries for all events except Kansas and Virginia International, wherein 19 entries will be permitted.
- GT Le Mans – Limited to 19 entries at Virginia International, 16 at Long Beach, 14 at Sebring and Indianapolis, and 12 entries at all other events.
- GT Daytona – Limited to 19 entries at all events with the exception of Detroit, where 21 entries would be allowed to compete.

=== Driver limits and classifications ===
Teams will be limited to utilizing a maximum of three drivers per car for events less than 6 hours in length. This capacity increases to four drivers for races from 6 hours up to 12 hours in length, and five drivers for the 24 Hours of Daytona.

The series will utilize a driver classification system, rating each driver as platinum, gold, silver, or bronze based on numerous factors regarding their competition history. Platinum and gold rated drivers are considered "pro" drivers, while silver and bronze rated drivers will be considered "amateur" or "gentleman" drivers.

In PC and GTD, a maximum of one Platinum or Gold-rated driver is permitted for two or three driver team combinations, with it being increased to two for Daytona and Sebring, should they utilize four or five-driver squads, however should a car utilize two platinum or gold-rated drivers, it must also utilize at least two silver or bronze-rated drivers, each meeting the minimum required driving time. Should this requirement go unfulfilled the team may be penalized at the discretion of the stewards, up to and including exclusion from the race results.

There are no driver classification restrictions in the P and GTLM classes.

A driver will be allowed to drive up to two cars in a single event, given that all minimum and maximum drive time limits are adhered to.

=== Drive time limits ===
The minimum and maximum allowable driving time for an individual driver vary by race and class as specified in the table below. No driver may drive for more than 4 hours of any 6 hour period at any time and that a minimum of two drivers must be used in each race. An exception are Prototype Challenge races with a two 45-minute segment format. These require a silver or bronze-rated driver for the first segment. Teams may use another driver with any rating in the second segment, but are not required to do so.

Race Length	Max # Drivers	PC/GTD Minimum	P/GTLM Minimum	Maximum
24 hours	5	4 hours 20 minutes	45 minutes	14 hours
12 hours	4	2 hours 50 minutes	45 minutes	8 hours
10 hours	4	2 hours 15 minutes	45 minutes	7 hours
6 hours	4	1 hour 25 minutes	45 minutes	4 hours
2 hours 45 minutes	3	60 minutes	20 minutes	None
2 hours	3	40 minutes	15 minutes	None
1 hour 40 minutes	3	35 minutes	10 minutes	None
2 x 45-minute segments	1 per segment	35 minutes	N/A	None

== Series development ==
On July 31, 2013, a tire partnership was announced, with Continental Tire serving as the exclusive tire supplier for the Prototype, Prototype Challenge and GT Daytona classes. Continental was previously the specification tire of the Rolex Sports Car Series, as well as the Prototype Challenge class in the American Le Mans Series.

On December 11, 2013, Michelin announced that they will supply tires for the GT Le Mans Class Teams Corvette Racing, BMW Team RLL, Risi Competizione, SRT Motorsports, Aston Martin Racing and the new Porsche North America team. Michelin previously supplied tires for LMP1, LMP2 and GT Classes of American Le Mans Series, and was the spec-tire of PC class from 2010 to 2012.

=== Rule changes ===
The series introduced several procedural changes after the first two races of 2014:

- Enforcement of an IMSA rule requiring the display of the car's number on its in-car cameras.
- Upgraded video review equipment to high definition (HD).
- A new system for cross-checking cars and drivers involved in on-track incidents.
- Addition of a third driver advisor to work alongside the IMSA Race Director and two driver advisors to assist with evaluating responsibility in incidents and other on-track situations.
- At events where there is only one prototype class in a race, the pits will be opened for that class when the field is packed up and while GT cars are still performing the Pass-Around procedure. This change will expedite the full-course caution process by a full lap.
- The “Lap-Down Wave-By” procedure – which provides a strategic opportunity for cars a lap or more behind to gain a lap back by staying on course while leaders make pit stops – will be more limited in its application. There will be no Lap-Down Wave-By in races less than two hours and 30 minutes in length. For races between two-and-a-half hours through six hours, the Lap-Down Wave-By will be used only once in any 90-minute period after 60 minutes from the start of a race. No Lap-Down Wave-By will be used in the last 30 minutes of a race.
- Efforts also will be made to use “Debris Yellows” where a situation is likely to involve the simple removal of debris or the flat-tow of a stopped car to a safe location. A Debris Yellow includes the Pass-Around procedure, but the pits remain closed until the race is restarted.

== Schedule ==
=== Official Testing ===
Three official preseason tests were conducted for 2014 for both team testing and to determine balance of performance adjustments for the classes. They were as follows:

- November 16–17, 2013 at Sebring International Raceway
- November 19–20, 2013 at Daytona International Speedway
- January 3–5 at Daytona International Speedway

One official test took place between the 24 Hours of Daytona and 12 Hours of Sebring.

- February 20–21 at Sebring International Raceway

=== Race schedule ===
The preliminary 2014 schedule was released on September 20, 2013, and featured twelve rounds. All circuits are carried over from the 2013 schedules of both the American Le Mans and Rolex Series. Circuits dropped were longtime sports car venues at Lime Rock Park and Mid-Ohio, as well as Barber and Baltimore.

Some rounds on the schedule will feature only some of the four classes in the USCC. Long Beach will only feature the Prototype and GTLM classes, Detroit will have all classes except GTLM, and Virginia will feature two separate races: an event for the GTLM and GTD classes, and another race solely for the Prototype Challenge class. This will give each category only 11 races in their respective championships, excepting the Prototype Challenge class, which will contest just 10 rounds.

The endurance races at Daytona, Sebring, Watkins Glen and Road Atlanta will retain their traditional lengths, while four events will have the regular 2 hour and 45 minute lengths (Mosport, Indianapolis, Road America, Austin), and the two street races will have 1 hour, 40 minute races (Long Beach and Detroit).

On October 11, 2013, a revised schedule was released. The key changes to the schedule included the addition of a stand-alone Prototype Challenge event to be held at Kansas Speedway on June 7. Subsequently, the Prototype Challenge events at Detroit and Canadian Tire Motorsport Park were removed, leaving the class with a 10 race schedule. It was also announced that two events would be contested during the May 4 event at Mazda Raceway Laguna Seca. One would feature the Prototype and GT Le Mans classes, while the other would feature the Prototype Challenge and GT Daytona classes.

It is expected that the Prototype Challenge events which will occur at Kansas Speedway and Virginia International Raceway will be combined with the Cooper Tires Prototype Lites development series in a two-segment race format.

The team winners of the North American Endurance Cup will receive prize money in each class: $100,000 for P or GTLM and $50,000 for PC or GTD.

The Rolex 24 at Daytona was broadcast on Fox, Fox Sports 1, Fox Sports 2 and IMSA.com in stages as TV slots change.

Race is part of the North American Endurance Cup

Rnd	Race	Length	Classes	Circuit	Location	Date
1	Rolex 24 at Daytona	24 hours	All	Daytona International Speedway	Daytona, Florida	January 25–26
2	Mobil 1 Twelve Hours of Sebring	12 hours	All	Sebring International Raceway	Sebring, Florida	March 15
3	Tequila Patrón Sports Car Showcase	1 hour 40 minutes	P, GTLM	Long Beach Street Circuit	Long Beach, California	April 12
4	Continental Tire Monterey Grand Prix	2 hours	PC, GTD	Mazda Raceway Laguna Seca	Monterey, California	May 4
4	Continental Tire Monterey Grand Prix	2 hours	P, GTLM	Mazda Raceway Laguna Seca	Monterey, California	May 4
5	Chevrolet Sports Car Classic	1 hour 40 minutes	P, GTD	The Raceway on Belle Isle	Detroit, Michigan	May 31
6	Grand Prix of Kansas	2 x 45-minute segments	PC^{1}	Kansas Speedway	Kansas City, Kansas	June 7
7	Sahlen's Six Hours of The Glen	6 hours	All	Watkins Glen International	Watkins Glen, New York	June 29
8	Mobil 1 SportsCar Grand Prix	2 hours 45 minutes	P, GTLM, GTD	Canadian Tire Motorsport Park	Bowmanville, Ontario	July 13
9	Brickyard Grand Prix	2 hours 45 minutes	All	Indianapolis Motor Speedway	Speedway, Indiana	July 25
10	Continental Tire Road Race Showcase	2 hours 45 minutes	All	Road America	Elkhart Lake, Wisconsin	August 10
11	Oak Tree Grand Prix	2 x 45-minute segments	PC^{1}	Virginia International Raceway	Alton, Virginia	August 24
11	Oak Tree Grand Prix	2 hours 45 minutes	GTLM, GTD	Virginia International Raceway	Alton, Virginia	August 24
12	Lone Star Le Mans	2 hours 45 minutes	All	Circuit of the Americas	Austin, Texas	September 20
13	Petit Le Mans	10 hours	All	Road Atlanta	Braselton, Georgia	October 4

==== Notes ====
1. Run in conjunction with the Cooper Tires Prototype Lites series.

== Entries ==
On December 6, 2013, IMSA unveiled the entry lists for the 2014 season, confirming entries with full and partial season statuses as well as revealing alternate entries for multiple classes due to an oversubscribed field.

=== Prototype ===
All entries use Continental tyres.

Team	Chassis	Engine	No.	Drivers	Rounds
(United States) DeltaWing Racing Cars	DeltaWing DWC13	Élan (Mazda) 1.9 L Turbo I4	0	(United Kingdom) Katherine Legge	1–2, 4, 7–8, 10, 13
(United States) DeltaWing Racing Cars	DeltaWing DWC13	Élan (Mazda) 1.9 L Turbo I4	0	(United Kingdom) Andy Meyrick	1–2, 4, 8, 10, 13
(United States) DeltaWing Racing Cars	DeltaWing DWC13	Élan (Mazda) 1.9 L Turbo I4	0	(Colombia) Gabby Chaves	1–2, 7, 13
(United States) DeltaWing Racing Cars	DeltaWing DWC13	Élan (Mazda) 1.9 L Turbo I4	0	(United States) Alexander Rossi	1
(United States) Extreme Speed Motorsports	HPD ARX-03b	Honda HR28TT 2.8 L Turbo V6	1	(United Kingdom) Ryan Dalziel	1–5, 7–10
(United States) Extreme Speed Motorsports	HPD ARX-03b	Honda HR28TT 2.8 L Turbo V6	1	(United States) Scott Sharp	1–5, 7–10
(United States) Extreme Speed Motorsports	HPD ARX-03b	Honda HR28TT 2.8 L Turbo V6	1	(Australia) David Brabham	1–2
(United States) Extreme Speed Motorsports	HPD ARX-03b	Honda HR28TT 2.8 L Turbo V6	2	(United States) Ed Brown	1–5, 7–10, 12
(United States) Extreme Speed Motorsports	HPD ARX-03b	Honda HR28TT 2.8 L Turbo V6	2	(United States) Johannes van Overbeek	1–5, 7–10, 12
(United States) Extreme Speed Motorsports	HPD ARX-03b	Honda HR28TT 2.8 L Turbo V6	2	(France) Simon Pagenaud	1–2
(United States) Extreme Speed Motorsports	HPD ARX-03b	Honda HR28TT 2.8 L Turbo V6	2	(United States) Anthony Lazzaro	1, 7
(United States) Action Express Racing	Coyote Corvette DP	Chevrolet 5.5 L V8	5	(Portugal) João Barbosa	All
(United States) Action Express Racing	Coyote Corvette DP	Chevrolet 5.5 L V8	5	(Brazil) Christian Fittipaldi	All
(United States) Action Express Racing	Coyote Corvette DP	Chevrolet 5.5 L V8	5	(France) Sébastien Bourdais	1–2, 13
(United States) Action Express Racing	Coyote Corvette DP	Chevrolet 5.5 L V8	5	(United States) Burt Frisselle	7
(United States) Action Express Racing	Coyote Corvette DP	Chevrolet 5.5 L V8	9	(United States) Brian Frisselle	1–2, 7, 13
(United States) Action Express Racing	Coyote Corvette DP	Chevrolet 5.5 L V8	9	(United States) Burt Frisselle	1–2, 7, 13
(United States) Action Express Racing	Coyote Corvette DP	Chevrolet 5.5 L V8	9	(France) Fabien Giroix	1
(United States) Action Express Racing	Coyote Corvette DP	Chevrolet 5.5 L V8	9	(Australia) John Martin	1
(United States) Action Express Racing	Coyote Corvette DP	Chevrolet 5.5 L V8	9	(United States) Jon Fogarty	2, 7, 13
(United States) Muscle Milk Pickett Racing	Oreca 03	Nissan VK45DE 4.5 L V8	6	(Germany) Klaus Graf	1–2
(United States) Muscle Milk Pickett Racing	Oreca 03	Nissan VK45DE 4.5 L V8	6	(Germany) Lucas Luhr	1–2
(United States) Muscle Milk Pickett Racing	Oreca 03	Nissan VK45DE 4.5 L V8	6	(United Kingdom) Alex Brundle	1
(United States) Muscle Milk Pickett Racing	Oreca 03	Nissan VK45DE 4.5 L V8	6	(United Kingdom) Jann Mardenborough	2
(United States) Wayne Taylor Racing	Dallara Corvette DP	Chevrolet 5.5 L V8	10	(United States) Jordan Taylor	All
(United States) Wayne Taylor Racing	Dallara Corvette DP	Chevrolet 5.5 L V8	10	(United States) Ricky Taylor	All
(United States) Wayne Taylor Racing	Dallara Corvette DP	Chevrolet 5.5 L V8	10	(Italy) Max Angelelli	1–2, 7, 13
(United States) Wayne Taylor Racing	Dallara Corvette DP	Chevrolet 5.5 L V8	10	(South Africa) Wayne Taylor	1
(United States) Marsh Racing	Coyote Corvette DP	Chevrolet 5.5 L V8	31	(United States) Eric Curran	All
(United States) Marsh Racing	Coyote Corvette DP	Chevrolet 5.5 L V8	31	(United States) Boris Said	1–5, 7–8, 12–13
(United States) Marsh Racing	Coyote Corvette DP	Chevrolet 5.5 L V8	31	(Italy) Max Papis	1, 13
(United States) Marsh Racing	Coyote Corvette DP	Chevrolet 5.5 L V8	31	(United Kingdom) Bradley Smith	1
(United States) Marsh Racing	Coyote Corvette DP	Chevrolet 5.5 L V8	31	(United States) Guy Cosmo	2, 7
(United States) Marsh Racing	Coyote Corvette DP	Chevrolet 5.5 L V8	31	(United States) Burt Frisselle	9–10
(France) OAK Racing	Morgan LMP2 1–10; Ligier JS P2 12–13	Nissan VK45DE 4.5 L V8 1–10; Honda HR28TT 2.8 L Turbo V6 12–13	42	(Colombia) Gustavo Yacamán	All
(France) OAK Racing	Morgan LMP2 1–10; Ligier JS P2 12–13	Nissan VK45DE 4.5 L V8 1–10; Honda HR28TT 2.8 L Turbo V6 12–13	42	(France) Olivier Pla	1–3, 5, 8, 10
(France) OAK Racing	Morgan LMP2 1–10; Ligier JS P2 12–13	Nissan VK45DE 4.5 L V8 1–10; Honda HR28TT 2.8 L Turbo V6 12–13	42	(Russia) Roman Rusinov	1
(France) OAK Racing	Morgan LMP2 1–10; Ligier JS P2 12–13	Nissan VK45DE 4.5 L V8 1–10; Honda HR28TT 2.8 L Turbo V6 12–13	42	(United Kingdom) Oliver Webb	1
(France) OAK Racing	Morgan LMP2 1–10; Ligier JS P2 12–13	Nissan VK45DE 4.5 L V8 1–10; Honda HR28TT 2.8 L Turbo V6 12–13	42	(United Kingdom) Alex Brundle	2, 4, 7, 12–13
(France) OAK Racing	Morgan LMP2 1–10; Ligier JS P2 12–13	Nissan VK45DE 4.5 L V8 1–10; Honda HR28TT 2.8 L Turbo V6 12–13	42	(China) Ho-Pin Tung	7, 9, 13
(United States) Fifty Plus Racing (Highway to Help)	Riley Mk XXVI DP	Dinan (BMW) 5.0 L V8	50	(United States) Byron DeFoor	1–2
(United States) Fifty Plus Racing (Highway to Help)	Riley Mk XXVI DP	Dinan (BMW) 5.0 L V8	50	(United Kingdom) David Hinton	1–2
(United States) Fifty Plus Racing (Highway to Help)	Riley Mk XXVI DP	Dinan (BMW) 5.0 L V8	50	(United States) Jim Pace	1–2
(United States) Fifty Plus Racing (Highway to Help)	Riley Mk XXVI DP	Dinan (BMW) 5.0 L V8	50	(United States) Frank Beck	1
(United States) Michael Shank Racing	Ford EcoBoost Riley DP	Ford Ecoboost D35 3.5 L Turbo V6	60	(Brazil) Oswaldo Negri Jr.	All
(United States) Michael Shank Racing	Ford EcoBoost Riley DP	Ford Ecoboost D35 3.5 L Turbo V6	60	(United States) John Pew	All
(United States) Michael Shank Racing	Ford EcoBoost Riley DP	Ford Ecoboost D35 3.5 L Turbo V6	60	(United Kingdom) Justin Wilson	1–2
(United States) Michael Shank Racing	Ford EcoBoost Riley DP	Ford Ecoboost D35 3.5 L Turbo V6	60	(United States) A. J. Allmendinger	1
(United States) SpeedSource	Lola B12/80 Mazda	Mazda SKYACTIV-D (SH-VPTS) 2.2 L Turbo I4 (diesel)	70	(United States) Tom Long	All
(United States) SpeedSource	Lola B12/80 Mazda	Mazda SKYACTIV-D (SH-VPTS) 2.2 L Turbo I4 (diesel)	70	(Canada) Sylvain Tremblay	All
(United States) SpeedSource	Lola B12/80 Mazda	Mazda SKYACTIV-D (SH-VPTS) 2.2 L Turbo I4 (diesel)	70	(Canada) James Hinchcliffe	1
(United States) SpeedSource	Lola B12/80 Mazda	Mazda SKYACTIV-D (SH-VPTS) 2.2 L Turbo I4 (diesel)	70	(United Kingdom) Ben Devlin	2, 7, 13
(United States) SpeedSource	Lola B12/80 Mazda	Mazda SKYACTIV-D (SH-VPTS) 2.2 L Turbo I4 (diesel)	07	(United States) Joel Miller	All
(United States) SpeedSource	Lola B12/80 Mazda	Mazda SKYACTIV-D (SH-VPTS) 2.2 L Turbo I4 (diesel)	07	(United States) Tristan Nunez	All
(United States) SpeedSource	Lola B12/80 Mazda	Mazda SKYACTIV-D (SH-VPTS) 2.2 L Turbo I4 (diesel)	07	(France) Tristan Vautier	1–2, 7, 13
(United States) Starworks Motorsport	Riley Mk XXVI DP	Dinan (BMW) 5.0 L V8 1 Honda HR35TT 3.5 L Turbo V6 2, 10	78	(United States) Scott Mayer	1–2, 10
(United States) Starworks Motorsport	Riley Mk XXVI DP	Dinan (BMW) 5.0 L V8 1 Honda HR35TT 3.5 L Turbo V6 2, 10	78	(Venezuela) Alex Popow	1–2
(United States) Starworks Motorsport	Riley Mk XXVI DP	Dinan (BMW) 5.0 L V8 1 Honda HR35TT 3.5 L Turbo V6 2, 10	78	(Colombia) Sebastián Saavedra	1–2
(United States) Starworks Motorsport	Riley Mk XXVI DP	Dinan (BMW) 5.0 L V8 1 Honda HR35TT 3.5 L Turbo V6 2, 10	78	(Venezuela) E. J. Viso	1
(United States) Starworks Motorsport	Riley Mk XXVI DP	Dinan (BMW) 5.0 L V8 1 Honda HR35TT 3.5 L Turbo V6 2, 10	78	(New Zealand) Brendon Hartley	1
(United States) Starworks Motorsport	Riley Mk XXVI DP	Dinan (BMW) 5.0 L V8 1 Honda HR35TT 3.5 L Turbo V6 2, 10	78	(Germany) Pierre Kaffer	2
(United States) Starworks Motorsport	Riley Mk XXVI DP	Dinan (BMW) 5.0 L V8 1 Honda HR35TT 3.5 L Turbo V6 2, 10	78	(Canada) James Hinchcliffe	10
(United States) Spirit of Daytona Racing	Coyote Corvette DP	Chevrolet 5.5 L V8	90	(Canada) Michael Valiante	All
(United States) Spirit of Daytona Racing	Coyote Corvette DP	Chevrolet 5.5 L V8	90	(United Kingdom) Richard Westbrook	All
(United States) Spirit of Daytona Racing	Coyote Corvette DP	Chevrolet 5.5 L V8	90	(Germany) Mike Rockenfeller	1–2, 13
(United States) GAINSCO/Bob Stallings Racing	Riley Corvette DP	Chevrolet 5.5 L V8	99	(United States) Jon Fogarty	1
(United States) GAINSCO/Bob Stallings Racing	Riley Corvette DP	Chevrolet 5.5 L V8	99	(United States) Memo Gidley	1
(United States) GAINSCO/Bob Stallings Racing	Riley Corvette DP	Chevrolet 5.5 L V8	99	(United States) Alex Gurney	1
(United States) GAINSCO/Bob Stallings Racing	Riley Corvette DP	Chevrolet 5.5 L V8	99	(United States) Darren Law	1
(United States) Chip Ganassi Racing	Ford EcoBoost Riley DP	Ford Ecoboost D35 3.5 L Turbo V6	01	(United States) Scott Pruett	All
(United States) Chip Ganassi Racing	Ford EcoBoost Riley DP	Ford Ecoboost D35 3.5 L Turbo V6	01	(Mexico) Memo Rojas	1–5, 7–8, 10, 12–13
(United States) Chip Ganassi Racing	Ford EcoBoost Riley DP	Ford Ecoboost D35 3.5 L Turbo V6	01	(United States) Sage Karam	1, 7, 9
(United States) Chip Ganassi Racing	Ford EcoBoost Riley DP	Ford Ecoboost D35 3.5 L Turbo V6	01	(United States) Jamie McMurray	1
(United States) Chip Ganassi Racing	Ford EcoBoost Riley DP	Ford Ecoboost D35 3.5 L Turbo V6	01	(United Kingdom) Marino Franchitti	2
(United States) Chip Ganassi Racing	Ford EcoBoost Riley DP	Ford Ecoboost D35 3.5 L Turbo V6	01	(New Zealand) Scott Dixon	13
(United States) Chip Ganassi Racing	Ford EcoBoost Riley DP	Ford Ecoboost D35 3.5 L Turbo V6	02	(New Zealand) Scott Dixon	1–2
(United States) Chip Ganassi Racing	Ford EcoBoost Riley DP	Ford Ecoboost D35 3.5 L Turbo V6	02	(Brazil) Tony Kanaan	1–2
(United States) Chip Ganassi Racing	Ford EcoBoost Riley DP	Ford Ecoboost D35 3.5 L Turbo V6	02	(United Kingdom) Marino Franchitti	1
(United States) Chip Ganassi Racing	Ford EcoBoost Riley DP	Ford Ecoboost D35 3.5 L Turbo V6	02	(United States) Kyle Larson	1
(United States) Chip Ganassi Racing	Ford EcoBoost Riley DP	Ford Ecoboost D35 3.5 L Turbo V6	02	(United States) Sage Karam	2

==== Notes ====
- Team Sahlen had initially announced intentions to campaign a pair of BMW-Riley Daytona Prototypes, but on November 9, 2013, it was announced that they would not compete in the championship and would instead focus on competing in the Continental Tire Sports Car Challenge ST class.
- GAINSCO/Bob Stallings Racing had planned to compete in the North American Endurance Cup, but pulled out of the championship following a crash at the Daytona 24 Hours that destroyed the car and injured Memo Gidley. Team owner Bob Stallings announced that he was shutting down the team for the remainder of the season.
- Before Sebring, Starworks Motorsport switched to a new V6 Honda engine for their #78 Daytona Prototype.
- Before Lone Star Le Mans, OAK Racing switched to a new Ligier JS P2 prototype with Honda engine.

=== Prototype Challenge ===
All entries use an Oreca FLM09 chassis powered by a Chevrolet LS3 6.2 L V8 on Continental tyres.

Team	No.	Drivers	Rounds
(United States) Starworks Motorsport	7	(Mexico) Martin Fuentes	1, 4, 6–7, 9–13
(United States) Starworks Motorsport	7	(Venezuela) Alex Popow	1, 10, 12
(United States) Starworks Motorsport	7	(Canada) Kyle Marcelli	1, 11
(United States) Starworks Motorsport	7	(Germany) Pierre Kaffer	1
(United States) Starworks Motorsport	7	(Spain) Isaac Tutumlu	1
(United States) Starworks Motorsport	7	(United Kingdom) Sam Bird	4, 7
(United States) Starworks Motorsport	7	(United Kingdom) Ryan Dalziel	6
(United States) Starworks Motorsport	7	(Australia) John Martin	9–10, 12–13
(United States) Starworks Motorsport	7	(United States) Ryan Eversley	13
(United States) Starworks Motorsport	7	(United States) Adam Merzon	13
(United States) Starworks Motorsport	8	(Netherlands) Renger van der Zande	All
(United States) Starworks Motorsport	8	(United Kingdom) Sam Bird	1–2
(United States) Starworks Motorsport	8	(Germany) Mirco Schultis	1, 4, 6–7, 9–13
(United States) Starworks Motorsport	8	(United States) Eric Lux	1
(United States) Starworks Motorsport	8	(United States) David Cheng	2
(United States) Starworks Motorsport	8	(Mexico) Martin Fuentes	2
(United States) Starworks Motorsport	8	(Australia) John Martin	13
(United States) Starworks Motorsport	8	(Venezuela) Alex Popow	13
(United States) 8Star Motorsports	25	(United Kingdom) Tom Kimber-Smith	1–2, 7, 13
(United States) 8Star Motorsports	25	(United States) Michael Marsal	1–2
(United States) 8Star Motorsports	25	(United Kingdom) Robert Huff	1
(United States) 8Star Motorsports	25	(Venezuela) Enzo Potolicchio	1
(United States) 8Star Motorsports	25	(United States) Sean Rayhall	2, 4, 6–7, 9–13
(United States) 8Star Motorsports	25	(United States) Eric Lux	2, 7, 13
(United States) 8Star Motorsports	25	(Mexico) Luis Díaz	4, 6–7, 9–12
(United States) Performance Tech	38	(Canada) David Ostella	All
(United States) Performance Tech	38	(Brazil) Raphael Matos	1–2
(United States) Performance Tech	38	(Brazil) Júlio Campos	1
(United States) Performance Tech	38	(Brazil) Gabriel Casagrande	1
(United States) Performance Tech	38	(United States) Tomy Drissi	1
(United States) Performance Tech	38	(United States) Charlie Shears	2, 4
(United States) Performance Tech	38	(United States) Mike Hedlund	7
(United States) Performance Tech	38	(United States) James French	9–13
(United States) Performance Tech	38	(United States) Jerome Mee	13
(United States) PR1/Mathiasen Motorsports	52	(United States) Gunnar Jeannette	All
(United States) PR1/Mathiasen Motorsports	52	(United States) Frankie Montecalvo	All
(United States) PR1/Mathiasen Motorsports	52	(United States) Mike Guasch	1–2
(United States) PR1/Mathiasen Motorsports	52	(United States) David Cheng	1
(United States) CORE Autosport	54	(United States) Jon Bennett	All
(United States) CORE Autosport	54	(United States) Colin Braun	All
(United States) CORE Autosport	54	(United States) James Gue	1–2, 7, 13
(United States) CORE Autosport	54	(Canada) Mark Wilkins	1
(United States) JDC-Miller MotorSports	85	(United States) Chris Miller	2, 4, 6–7, 9–13
(United States) JDC-Miller MotorSports	85	(South Africa) Stephen Simpson	2, 4, 6–7, 9–10, 12–13
(United States) JDC-Miller MotorSports	85	(United States) Gerry Kraut	2
(United States) JDC-Miller MotorSports	85	(United States) Tomy Drissi	7
(United States) JDC-Miller MotorSports	85	(Canada) Mikhail Goikhberg	13
(United States) BAR1 Motorsports	87	(Estonia) Tõnis Kasemets	1–2
(United States) BAR1 Motorsports	87	(United States) Gaston Kearby	1–2
(United States) BAR1 Motorsports	87	(United States) Doug Bielefeld	1
(United States) BAR1 Motorsports	87	(Australia) James Kovacic	1
(United States) BAR1 Motorsports	87	(United States) Sean Rayhall	1
(United States) BAR1 Motorsports	87	(United States) Bruce Hamilton	2
(United States) BAR1 Motorsports	87	(United States) Marc Drumwright	12–13
(United States) BAR1 Motorsports	87	(United Kingdom) Martin Plowman	12–13
(United States) BAR1 Motorsports	87	(United States) Tomy Drissi	13
(United States) BAR1 Motorsports	88	(United States) Doug Bielefeld	2, 4, 6–7, 9
(United States) BAR1 Motorsports	88	(United Kingdom) Martin Plowman	2, 7, 9
(United States) BAR1 Motorsports	88	(United States) Tomy Drissi	2
(United States) BAR1 Motorsports	88	(United States) Chapman Ducote	2
(United States) BAR1 Motorsports	88	(United States) Ryan Eversley	4
(United States) BAR1 Motorsports	88	(United States) David Cheng	7, 13
(United States) BAR1 Motorsports	88	(United Kingdom) Johnny Mowlem	12–13
(United States) BAR1 Motorsports	88	(United States) Tom Papadopoulos	12–13
(United States) RSR Racing	08	(Canada) Chris Cumming	All
(United States) RSR Racing	08	(Canada) Alex Tagliani	1–2, 4, 6–7, 11
(United States) RSR Racing	08	(United States) Rusty Mitchell	1–2, 7, 13
(United States) RSR Racing	08	(United States) Conor Daly	1
(United States) RSR Racing	08	(United Kingdom) Jack Hawksworth	9–10, 12–13
(United States) RSR Racing	09	(United States) Duncan Ende	All
(United States) RSR Racing	09	(Brazil) Bruno Junqueira	All
(United States) RSR Racing	09	(Denmark) David Heinemeier Hansson	1–2, 13
(United States) RSR Racing	09	(United States) Gustavo Menezes	1
(United States) RSR Racing	09	(United Kingdom) Ryan Lewis	7

=== GT Le Mans ===
Team	Chassis	Engine	Tyre	No.	Drivers	Rounds
(United States) Corvette Racing	Chevrolet Corvette C7.R	Chevrolet LT5.5R 5.5 L V8	M	3	(Spain) Antonio García	All
(United States) Corvette Racing	Chevrolet Corvette C7.R	Chevrolet LT5.5R 5.5 L V8	M	3	(Denmark) Jan Magnussen	1–4, 7–10, 12–13
(United States) Corvette Racing	Chevrolet Corvette C7.R	Chevrolet LT5.5R 5.5 L V8	M	3	(Australia) Ryan Briscoe	1–2, 13
(United States) Corvette Racing	Chevrolet Corvette C7.R	Chevrolet LT5.5R 5.5 L V8	M	3	(United States) Jordan Taylor	11
(United States) Corvette Racing	Chevrolet Corvette C7.R	Chevrolet LT5.5R 5.5 L V8	M	4	(United Kingdom) Oliver Gavin	All
(United States) Corvette Racing	Chevrolet Corvette C7.R	Chevrolet LT5.5R 5.5 L V8	M	4	(United States) Tommy Milner	All
(United States) Corvette Racing	Chevrolet Corvette C7.R	Chevrolet LT5.5R 5.5 L V8	M	4	(United Kingdom) Robin Liddell	1–2
(United States) Corvette Racing	Chevrolet Corvette C7.R	Chevrolet LT5.5R 5.5 L V8	M	4	(Australia) Ryan Briscoe	13
(Germany) Team Falken Tire	Porsche 911 RSR	Porsche 4.0 L Flat-6	F	17	(Germany) Wolf Henzler	2–4, 7–13
(Germany) Team Falken Tire	Porsche 911 RSR	Porsche 4.0 L Flat-6	F	17	(United States) Bryan Sellers	2–4, 7–13
(Germany) Team Falken Tire	Porsche 911 RSR	Porsche 4.0 L Flat-6	F	17	(Germany) Marco Holzer	2, 13
(United States) BMW Team RLL	BMW Z4 GTE	BMW P65B44 4.4 L V8	M	55	(United States) Bill Auberlen	All
(United States) BMW Team RLL	BMW Z4 GTE	BMW P65B44 4.4 L V8	M	55	(United Kingdom) Andy Priaulx	All
(United States) BMW Team RLL	BMW Z4 GTE	BMW P65B44 4.4 L V8	M	55	(United States) Joey Hand	1–2, 13
(United States) BMW Team RLL	BMW Z4 GTE	BMW P65B44 4.4 L V8	M	55	(Belgium) Maxime Martin	1
(United States) BMW Team RLL	BMW Z4 GTE	BMW P65B44 4.4 L V8	M	56	(United States) John Edwards	All
(United States) BMW Team RLL	BMW Z4 GTE	BMW P65B44 4.4 L V8	M	56	(Germany) Dirk Müller	All
(United States) BMW Team RLL	BMW Z4 GTE	BMW P65B44 4.4 L V8	M	56	(Germany) Dirk Werner	1–2, 13
(United States) BMW Team RLL	BMW Z4 GTE	BMW P65B44 4.4 L V8	M	56	(United States) Graham Rahal	1
(United States) Krohn Racing	Ferrari 458 Italia GT2	Ferrari F136 4.5 L V8	M	57	(Sweden) Niclas Jönsson	1–2, 4, 7, 13
(United States) Krohn Racing	Ferrari 458 Italia GT2	Ferrari F136 4.5 L V8	M	57	(United States) Tracy Krohn	1–2, 4, 7, 13
(United States) Krohn Racing	Ferrari 458 Italia GT2	Ferrari F136 4.5 L V8	M	57	(Italy) Andrea Bertolini	1–2, 13
(United States) Krohn Racing	Ferrari 458 Italia GT2	Ferrari F136 4.5 L V8	M	57	(United Kingdom) Peter Dumbreck	1
(United States) Risi Competizione	Ferrari 458 Italia GT2	Ferrari F136 4.5 L V8	M	62	(Italy) Giancarlo Fisichella	All
(United States) Risi Competizione	Ferrari 458 Italia GT2	Ferrari F136 4.5 L V8	M	62	(Italy) Gianmaria Bruni	1–2
(United States) Risi Competizione	Ferrari 458 Italia GT2	Ferrari F136 4.5 L V8	M	62	(Italy) Matteo Malucelli	1–2
(United States) Risi Competizione	Ferrari 458 Italia GT2	Ferrari F136 4.5 L V8	M	62	(Monaco) Olivier Beretta	1, 13
(United States) Risi Competizione	Ferrari 458 Italia GT2	Ferrari F136 4.5 L V8	M	62	(United States) Dane Cameron	3
(United States) Risi Competizione	Ferrari 458 Italia GT2	Ferrari F136 4.5 L V8	M	62	(Germany) Pierre Kaffer	4, 7–13
(United States) SRT Motorsports	SRT Viper GTS-R	Dodge 8.0 L V10	M	91	(Belgium) Marc Goossens	All
(United States) SRT Motorsports	SRT Viper GTS-R	Dodge 8.0 L V10	M	91	(Germany) Dominik Farnbacher	1–4, 7–12
(United States) SRT Motorsports	SRT Viper GTS-R	Dodge 8.0 L V10	M	91	(United States) Ryan Hunter-Reay	1–2, 13
(United States) SRT Motorsports	SRT Viper GTS-R	Dodge 8.0 L V10	M	91	(United States) Jonathan Bomarito	3, 7
(United States) SRT Motorsports	SRT Viper GTS-R	Dodge 8.0 L V10	M	91	(Canada) Kuno Wittmer	13
(United States) SRT Motorsports	SRT Viper GTS-R	Dodge 8.0 L V10	M	93	(United States) Jonathan Bomarito	All
(United States) SRT Motorsports	SRT Viper GTS-R	Dodge 8.0 L V10	M	93	(Canada) Kuno Wittmer	1–4, 7–12
(United States) SRT Motorsports	SRT Viper GTS-R	Dodge 8.0 L V10	M	93	(United Kingdom) Rob Bell	1–2, 13
(United States) SRT Motorsports	SRT Viper GTS-R	Dodge 8.0 L V10	M	93	(Belgium) Marc Goossens	3, 7
(United States) SRT Motorsports	SRT Viper GTS-R	Dodge 8.0 L V10	M	93	(Germany) Dominik Farnbacher	11, 13
(United Kingdom) Aston Martin Racing	Aston Martin Vantage GTE	Aston Martin AM05 4.5 L V8	M	97	(Canada) Paul Dalla Lana	1
(United Kingdom) Aston Martin Racing	Aston Martin Vantage GTE	Aston Martin AM05 4.5 L V8	M	97	(Portugal) Pedro Lamy	1
(United Kingdom) Aston Martin Racing	Aston Martin Vantage GTE	Aston Martin AM05 4.5 L V8	M	97	(Germany) Stefan Mücke	1
(United Kingdom) Aston Martin Racing	Aston Martin Vantage GTE	Aston Martin AM05 4.5 L V8	M	97	(New Zealand) Richie Stanaway	1
(United Kingdom) Aston Martin Racing	Aston Martin Vantage GTE	Aston Martin AM05 4.5 L V8	M	97	(United Kingdom) Darren Turner	1
(United States) / CORE Autosport (Note: 1. 910 entered as CORE Autosport and #911 and #912 entered as Porsche North America.); (United States) / Porsche North America	Porsche 911 RSR	Porsche 4.0 L Flat-6	M	910	(France) Frédéric Makowiecki	12
(United States) / CORE Autosport; (United States) / Porsche North America	Porsche 911 RSR	Porsche 4.0 L Flat-6	M	910	(France) Patrick Pilet	12
(United States) / CORE Autosport; (United States) / Porsche North America	Porsche 911 RSR	Porsche 4.0 L Flat-6	M	911	(United Kingdom) Nick Tandy	All
(United States) / CORE Autosport; (United States) / Porsche North America	Porsche 911 RSR	Porsche 4.0 L Flat-6	M	911	(Austria) Richard Lietz	1–4, 7–10
(United States) / CORE Autosport; (United States) / Porsche North America	Porsche 911 RSR	Porsche 4.0 L Flat-6	M	911	(France) Patrick Pilet	1–2, 7, 13
(United States) / CORE Autosport; (United States) / Porsche North America	Porsche 911 RSR	Porsche 4.0 L Flat-6	M	911	(Denmark) Michael Christensen	11
(United States) / CORE Autosport; (United States) / Porsche North America	Porsche 911 RSR	Porsche 4.0 L Flat-6	M	911	(Germany) Jörg Bergmeister	12–13
(United States) / CORE Autosport; (United States) / Porsche North America	Porsche 911 RSR	Porsche 4.0 L Flat-6	M	912	(Denmark) Michael Christensen	All
(United States) / CORE Autosport; (United States) / Porsche North America	Porsche 911 RSR	Porsche 4.0 L Flat-6	M	912	(United States) Patrick Long	All
(United States) / CORE Autosport; (United States) / Porsche North America	Porsche 911 RSR	Porsche 4.0 L Flat-6	M	912	(Germany) Jörg Bergmeister	1–2
(United States) / CORE Autosport; (United States) / Porsche North America	Porsche 911 RSR	Porsche 4.0 L Flat-6	M	912	(France) Patrick Pilet	7
(United States) / CORE Autosport; (United States) / Porsche North America	Porsche 911 RSR	Porsche 4.0 L Flat-6	M	912	(New Zealand) Earl Bamber	13

==== Notes ====
- The Team Falken Tire entry was a full-season entry, but did not participate in the 24 Hours of Daytona, and began their season with the 12 Hours of Sebring.
- While having previously planned on running the North American Endurance Cup events of the 2014 United SportsCar Championship, Aston Martin Racing elected to withdraw from the series after a disappointing showing at Daytona and instead focus on the upcoming 2014 FIA World Endurance Championship season.

=== GT Daytona ===
All entries use Continental tyres.

Team	Chassis	Engine	No.	Drivers	Rounds
(Belgium) Mühlner Motorsports America	Porsche 911 GT America	Porsche 4.0 L Flat-6	18	(New Zealand) Earl Bamber	1–2
(Belgium) Mühlner Motorsports America	Porsche 911 GT America	Porsche 4.0 L Flat-6	18	(Italy) Eugenio Amos	1
(Belgium) Mühlner Motorsports America	Porsche 911 GT America	Porsche 4.0 L Flat-6	18	(United States) Bradley Blum	1
(Belgium) Mühlner Motorsports America	Porsche 911 GT America	Porsche 4.0 L Flat-6	18	(Switzerland) Alexandre Imperatori	1
(Belgium) Mühlner Motorsports America	Porsche 911 GT America	Porsche 4.0 L Flat-6	18	(United States) Ronald Zitza	1
(Belgium) Mühlner Motorsports America	Porsche 911 GT America	Porsche 4.0 L Flat-6	18	(Belgium) Nico Verdonck	2
(Belgium) Mühlner Motorsports America	Porsche 911 GT America	Porsche 4.0 L Flat-6	18	(Australia) David Calvert-Jones	4, 7, 10
(Belgium) Mühlner Motorsports America	Porsche 911 GT America	Porsche 4.0 L Flat-6	18	(United States) Matt Bell	4
(Belgium) Mühlner Motorsports America	Porsche 911 GT America	Porsche 4.0 L Flat-6	18	(Germany) Sebastian Asch	5
(Belgium) Mühlner Motorsports America	Porsche 911 GT America	Porsche 4.0 L Flat-6	18	(United States) Tomy Drissi	5
(Belgium) Mühlner Motorsports America	Porsche 911 GT America	Porsche 4.0 L Flat-6	18	(United States) Peter Ludwig	7
(Belgium) Mühlner Motorsports America	Porsche 911 GT America	Porsche 4.0 L Flat-6	18	(Haiti) Patrick-Otto Madsen	7
(Belgium) Mühlner Motorsports America	Porsche 911 GT America	Porsche 4.0 L Flat-6	18	(Canada) Chris Green	8
(Belgium) Mühlner Motorsports America	Porsche 911 GT America	Porsche 4.0 L Flat-6	18	(Canada) Mark Thomas	8
(Belgium) Mühlner Motorsports America	Porsche 911 GT America	Porsche 4.0 L Flat-6	18	(Australia) Alex Davison	10
(Belgium) Mühlner Motorsports America	Porsche 911 GT America	Porsche 4.0 L Flat-6	18	(United States) Mark Kvamme	11
(Belgium) Mühlner Motorsports America	Porsche 911 GT America	Porsche 4.0 L Flat-6	18	(United States) Corey Lewis	11
(Belgium) Mühlner Motorsports America	Porsche 911 GT America	Porsche 4.0 L Flat-6	18	(United Arab Emirates) Khaled Al Qubaisi	12
(Belgium) Mühlner Motorsports America	Porsche 911 GT America	Porsche 4.0 L Flat-6	18	(United States) Larry Pegram	12
(Belgium) Mühlner Motorsports America	Porsche 911 GT America	Porsche 4.0 L Flat-6	19	(United States) Mark Kvamme	1, 4, 9, 13
(Belgium) Mühlner Motorsports America	Porsche 911 GT America	Porsche 4.0 L Flat-6	19	(United States) Bob Doyle	1
(Belgium) Mühlner Motorsports America	Porsche 911 GT America	Porsche 4.0 L Flat-6	19	(United States) Robert Gewirtz	1
(Belgium) Mühlner Motorsports America	Porsche 911 GT America	Porsche 4.0 L Flat-6	19	(United States) Jim Michaelian	1
(Belgium) Mühlner Motorsports America	Porsche 911 GT America	Porsche 4.0 L Flat-6	19	(United States) Randy Pobst	1, 9
(Belgium) Mühlner Motorsports America	Porsche 911 GT America	Porsche 4.0 L Flat-6	19	(United States) Jim Taggart	1
(Belgium) Mühlner Motorsports America	Porsche 911 GT America	Porsche 4.0 L Flat-6	19	(New Zealand) Earl Bamber	2
(Belgium) Mühlner Motorsports America	Porsche 911 GT America	Porsche 4.0 L Flat-6	19	(United States) Kyle Gimple	2
(Belgium) Mühlner Motorsports America	Porsche 911 GT America	Porsche 4.0 L Flat-6	19	(Italy) Ruggero Melgrati	2
(Belgium) Mühlner Motorsports America	Porsche 911 GT America	Porsche 4.0 L Flat-6	19	(United States) Dillon Machavern	4
(Belgium) Mühlner Motorsports America	Porsche 911 GT America	Porsche 4.0 L Flat-6	19	(Germany) Sebastian Asch	5
(Belgium) Mühlner Motorsports America	Porsche 911 GT America	Porsche 4.0 L Flat-6	19	(United States) Tomy Drissi	5
(Belgium) Mühlner Motorsports America	Porsche 911 GT America	Porsche 4.0 L Flat-6	19	(United States) Mark Klenin	10, 12
(Belgium) Mühlner Motorsports America	Porsche 911 GT America	Porsche 4.0 L Flat-6	19	(United States) Christian Szymczak	10
(Belgium) Mühlner Motorsports America	Porsche 911 GT America	Porsche 4.0 L Flat-6	19	(United States) Alec Udell	12
(Belgium) Mühlner Motorsports America	Porsche 911 GT America	Porsche 4.0 L Flat-6	19	(United Kingdom) Daniel Lloyd	13
(Belgium) Mühlner Motorsports America	Porsche 911 GT America	Porsche 4.0 L Flat-6	19	(United States) Larry Pegram	13
(United States) / Alex Job Racing (Note: 1. 22 entered as Alex Job Racing and #23 entered as Team Seattle / Alex Job Racing.); (United States) / Team Seattle / Alex Job Racing	Porsche 911 GT America	Porsche 4.0 L Flat-6	22	(United States) Leh Keen	All
(United States) / Alex Job Racing; (United States) / Team Seattle / Alex Job Racing	Porsche 911 GT America	Porsche 4.0 L Flat-6	22	(United States) Cooper MacNeil	All
(United States) / Alex Job Racing; (United States) / Team Seattle / Alex Job Racing	Porsche 911 GT America	Porsche 4.0 L Flat-6	22	(Canada) Louis-Philippe Dumoulin	1
(United States) / Alex Job Racing; (United States) / Team Seattle / Alex Job Racing	Porsche 911 GT America	Porsche 4.0 L Flat-6	22	(United States) Shane Lewis	1
(United States) / Alex Job Racing; (United States) / Team Seattle / Alex Job Racing	Porsche 911 GT America	Porsche 4.0 L Flat-6	22	(New Zealand) Shane van Gisbergen	1
(United States) / Alex Job Racing; (United States) / Team Seattle / Alex Job Racing	Porsche 911 GT America	Porsche 4.0 L Flat-6	22	(Switzerland) Philipp Frommenwiler	2, 7
(United States) / Alex Job Racing; (United States) / Team Seattle / Alex Job Racing	Porsche 911 GT America	Porsche 4.0 L Flat-6	22	(United States) Craig Stanton	13
(United States) / Alex Job Racing; (United States) / Team Seattle / Alex Job Racing	Porsche 911 GT America	Porsche 4.0 L Flat-6	23	(Germany) Mario Farnbacher	All
(United States) / Alex Job Racing; (United States) / Team Seattle / Alex Job Racing	Porsche 911 GT America	Porsche 4.0 L Flat-6	23	(United Kingdom) Ian James	All
(United States) / Alex Job Racing; (United States) / Team Seattle / Alex Job Racing	Porsche 911 GT America	Porsche 4.0 L Flat-6	23	(Spain) Alex Riberas	1–2, 13
(United States) / Alex Job Racing; (United States) / Team Seattle / Alex Job Racing	Porsche 911 GT America	Porsche 4.0 L Flat-6	23	(Germany) Marco Holzer	1
(United States) Dempsey Racing	Porsche 911 GT America	Porsche 4.0 L Flat-6	27	(United States) Andrew Davis	All
(United States) Dempsey Racing	Porsche 911 GT America	Porsche 4.0 L Flat-6	27	(United States) Patrick Dempsey	1–2, 4, 7–13
(United States) Dempsey Racing	Porsche 911 GT America	Porsche 4.0 L Flat-6	27	(United States) Joe Foster	1–2, 7, 13
(United States) Dempsey Racing	Porsche 911 GT America	Porsche 4.0 L Flat-6	27	(Germany) Marc Lieb	1
(United States) Dempsey Racing	Porsche 911 GT America	Porsche 4.0 L Flat-6	27	(Austria) Norbert Siedler	2
(United States) Dempsey Racing	Porsche 911 GT America	Porsche 4.0 L Flat-6	27	(United States) Brett Sandberg	5
(United States) Dempsey Racing	Porsche 911 GT America	Porsche 4.0 L Flat-6	28	(Germany) Christian Engelhart	1–2
(United States) Dempsey Racing	Porsche 911 GT America	Porsche 4.0 L Flat-6	28	(Switzerland) Rolf Ineichen	1–2
(United States) Dempsey Racing	Porsche 911 GT America	Porsche 4.0 L Flat-6	28	(Austria) Franz Konrad	1–2
(United States) Dempsey Racing	Porsche 911 GT America	Porsche 4.0 L Flat-6	28	(Austria) Klaus Bachler	1
(United States) Dempsey Racing	Porsche 911 GT America	Porsche 4.0 L Flat-6	28	(United States) Lance Willsey	1
(United States) NGT Motorsport	Porsche 911 GT America	Porsche 4.0 L Flat-6	30	(Poland) Kuba Giermaziak	1–2, 4–5, 7, 12
(United States) NGT Motorsport	Porsche 911 GT America	Porsche 4.0 L Flat-6	30	(Venezuela) Henrique Cisneros	1–2, 4–5, 12
(United States) NGT Motorsport	Porsche 911 GT America	Porsche 4.0 L Flat-6	30	(Denmark) Christina Nielsen	1–2, 7
(United States) NGT Motorsport	Porsche 911 GT America	Porsche 4.0 L Flat-6	30	(Denmark) Nicki Thiim	1
(United States) GMG Racing	Audi R8 LMS ultra	Audi 5.2 L V10	32	(Germany) Marc Basseng	1–2
(United States) GMG Racing	Audi R8 LMS ultra	Audi 5.2 L V10	32	(United States) James Sofronas	1–2
(United States) GMG Racing	Audi R8 LMS ultra	Audi 5.2 L V10	32	(United States) Alex Welch	1–2
(United States) GMG Racing	Audi R8 LMS ultra	Audi 5.2 L V10	32	(Germany) Frank Stippler	1
(United States) Riley Motorsports	SRT Viper GT3-R	SRT 8.0 L V10	33	(United States) Ben Keating	All
(United States) Riley Motorsports	SRT Viper GT3-R	SRT 8.0 L V10	33	(Netherlands) Jeroen Bleekemolen	1–2, 4–5, 7–10, 12–13
(United States) Riley Motorsports	SRT Viper GT3-R	SRT 8.0 L V10	33	(Netherlands) Sebastiaan Bleekemolen	1–2, 13
(United States) Riley Motorsports	SRT Viper GT3-R	SRT 8.0 L V10	33	(France) Emmanuel Collard	1
(United States) Riley Motorsports	SRT Viper GT3-R	SRT 8.0 L V10	33	(United States) Tony Ave	11
(United States) Flying Lizard Motorsports	Audi R8 LMS ultra	Audi 5.2 L V10	35	(South Africa) Dion von Moltke	All
(United States) Flying Lizard Motorsports	Audi R8 LMS ultra	Audi 5.2 L V10	35	(United States) Seth Neiman	1–2, 4–5, 7–8, 12–13
(United States) Flying Lizard Motorsports	Audi R8 LMS ultra	Audi 5.2 L V10	35	(Portugal) Filipe Albuquerque	1–2
(United States) Flying Lizard Motorsports	Audi R8 LMS ultra	Audi 5.2 L V10	35	(United Kingdom) Alessandro Latif	1, 13
(United States) Flying Lizard Motorsports	Audi R8 LMS ultra	Audi 5.2 L V10	35	(United States) Spencer Pumpelly	7–9, 11
(United States) Flying Lizard Motorsports	Audi R8 LMS ultra	Audi 5.2 L V10	35	(United States) Andrew Palmer	10
(United States) Flying Lizard Motorsports	Audi R8 LMS ultra	Audi 5.2 L V10	45	(Venezuela) Nelson Canache Jr.	All
(United States) Flying Lizard Motorsports	Audi R8 LMS ultra	Audi 5.2 L V10	45	(United States) Spencer Pumpelly	All
(United States) Flying Lizard Motorsports	Audi R8 LMS ultra	Audi 5.2 L V10	45	(Germany) Markus Winkelhock	1–2
(United States) Flying Lizard Motorsports	Audi R8 LMS ultra	Audi 5.2 L V10	45	(United States) Tim Pappas	1
(United States) Flying Lizard Motorsports	Audi R8 LMS ultra	Audi 5.2 L V10	45	(United Kingdom) Alessandro Latif	2
(United States) Flying Lizard Motorsports	Audi R8 LMS ultra	Audi 5.2 L V10	45	(United States) Brett Sandberg	7
(United States) Flying Lizard Motorsports	Audi R8 LMS ultra	Audi 5.2 L V10	45	(South Africa) Dion von Moltke	8
(United States) Flying Lizard Motorsports	Audi R8 LMS ultra	Audi 5.2 L V10	45	(United States) Andrew Palmer	13
(United States) Magnus Racing	Porsche 911 GT America	Porsche 4.0 L Flat-6	44	(United States) Andy Lally	All
(United States) Magnus Racing	Porsche 911 GT America	Porsche 4.0 L Flat-6	44	(United States) John Potter	All
(United States) Magnus Racing	Porsche 911 GT America	Porsche 4.0 L Flat-6	44	(Canada) Jean-François Dumoulin	1
(United States) Magnus Racing	Porsche 911 GT America	Porsche 4.0 L Flat-6	44	(Germany) Wolf Henzler	1
(United States) Magnus Racing	Porsche 911 GT America	Porsche 4.0 L Flat-6	44	(Germany) Marco Seefried	2, 13
(United States) Magnus Racing	Porsche 911 GT America	Porsche 4.0 L Flat-6	44	(Germany) Sebastian Asch	7
(United States) Fall-Line Motorsports	Audi R8 LMS ultra	Audi 5.2 L V10	46	(United States) Charles Espenlaub	1–2, 4–11
(United States) Fall-Line Motorsports	Audi R8 LMS ultra	Audi 5.2 L V10	46	(United States) Charles Putman	1–2, 4–11
(United States) Fall-Line Motorsports	Audi R8 LMS ultra	Audi 5.2 L V10	46	(United Kingdom) Oliver Jarvis	1
(United States) Fall-Line Motorsports	Audi R8 LMS ultra	Audi 5.2 L V10	46	(United Kingdom) James Walker	1
(United States) Fall-Line Motorsports	Audi R8 LMS ultra	Audi 5.2 L V10	46	(Germany) Christopher Mies	2
(United States) Fall-Line Motorsports	Audi R8 LMS ultra	Audi 5.2 L V10	46	(Italy) Marco Bonanomi	7
(United States) Fall-Line Motorsports	Audi R8 LMS ultra	Audi 5.2 L V10	46	(United Kingdom) Marino Franchitti	10–11
(United States) Paul Miller Racing	Audi R8 LMS ultra	Audi 5.2 L V10	48	(Germany) Christopher Haase	All
(United States) Paul Miller Racing	Audi R8 LMS ultra	Audi 5.2 L V10	48	(United States) Bryce Miller	All
(United States) Paul Miller Racing	Audi R8 LMS ultra	Audi 5.2 L V10	48	(United Kingdom) Matthew Bell	1–2, 13
(United States) Paul Miller Racing	Audi R8 LMS ultra	Audi 5.2 L V10	48	(Germany) René Rast	1
(Switzerland) Spirit of Race	Ferrari 458 Italia GT3	Ferrari F136 4.5 L V8	49	(Italy) Gianluca Roda	1–2
(Switzerland) Spirit of Race	Ferrari 458 Italia GT3	Ferrari F136 4.5 L V8	49	(Italy) Paolo Ruberti	1–2
(Switzerland) Spirit of Race	Ferrari 458 Italia GT3	Ferrari F136 4.5 L V8	49	(Italy) Piergiuseppe Perazzini	1, 13
(Switzerland) Spirit of Race	Ferrari 458 Italia GT3	Ferrari F136 4.5 L V8	49	(Italy) Davide Rigon	1
(Switzerland) Spirit of Race	Ferrari 458 Italia GT3	Ferrari F136 4.5 L V8	49	(Italy) Mirko Venturi	2
(Switzerland) Spirit of Race	Ferrari 458 Italia GT3	Ferrari F136 4.5 L V8	49	(Italy) Eddie Cheever III	13
(Switzerland) Spirit of Race	Ferrari 458 Italia GT3	Ferrari F136 4.5 L V8	49	(Italy) Marco Cioci	13
(Switzerland) Spirit of Race	Ferrari 458 Italia GT3	Ferrari F136 4.5 L V8	51	(South Africa) Jack Gerber	1–2, 4, 7
(Switzerland) Spirit of Race	Ferrari 458 Italia GT3	Ferrari F136 4.5 L V8	51	(Republic of Ireland) Matt Griffin	1–2, 7, 13
(Switzerland) Spirit of Race	Ferrari 458 Italia GT3	Ferrari F136 4.5 L V8	51	(Italy) Michele Rugolo	1–2, 7, 13
(Switzerland) Spirit of Race	Ferrari 458 Italia GT3	Ferrari F136 4.5 L V8	51	(Italy) Marco Cioci	1–2
(Switzerland) Spirit of Race	Ferrari 458 Italia GT3	Ferrari F136 4.5 L V8	51	(Italy) Eddie Cheever III	4
(Switzerland) Spirit of Race	Ferrari 458 Italia GT3	Ferrari F136 4.5 L V8	51	(Thailand) Pasin Lathouras	13
(United States) Snow Racing (Note: Car entered as Rum Bum/Snow Racing with no. 13 in Round 2.)	Porsche 911 GT America	Porsche 4.0 L Flat-6	58	(Belgium) Jan Heylen	All
(United States) Snow Racing	Porsche 911 GT America	Porsche 4.0 L Flat-6	58	(United States) Madison Snow	All
(United States) Snow Racing	Porsche 911 GT America	Porsche 4.0 L Flat-6	58	(Germany) Marco Seefried	1
(United States) Snow Racing	Porsche 911 GT America	Porsche 4.0 L Flat-6	58	(United States) Hugh Plumb	2
(United States) Snow Racing	Porsche 911 GT America	Porsche 4.0 L Flat-6	58	(United States) Matt Plumb	2
(United States) Snow Racing	Porsche 911 GT America	Porsche 4.0 L Flat-6	58	(United States) Patrick Dempsey	13
(United States) Scuderia Corsa	Ferrari 458 Italia GT3	Ferrari F136 4.5 L V8	63	(Italy) Alessandro Balzan	All
(United States) Scuderia Corsa	Ferrari 458 Italia GT3	Ferrari F136 4.5 L V8	63	(United States) Jeff Westphal	All
(United States) Scuderia Corsa	Ferrari 458 Italia GT3	Ferrari F136 4.5 L V8	63	(Italy) Lorenzo Casè	1–2
(United States) Scuderia Corsa	Ferrari 458 Italia GT3	Ferrari F136 4.5 L V8	63	(Finland) Toni Vilander	1
(United States) Scuderia Corsa	Ferrari 458 Italia GT3	Ferrari F136 4.5 L V8	63	(Canada) Kyle Marcelli	2, 13
(United States) Scuderia Corsa	Ferrari 458 Italia GT3	Ferrari F136 4.5 L V8	63	(United States) Brandon Davis	7, 13
(United States) Scuderia Corsa	Ferrari 458 Italia GT3	Ferrari F136 4.5 L V8	64	(Canada) David Empringham	1
(United States) Scuderia Corsa	Ferrari 458 Italia GT3	Ferrari F136 4.5 L V8	64	(Canada) John Farano	1
(United States) Scuderia Corsa	Ferrari 458 Italia GT3	Ferrari F136 4.5 L V8	64	(United States) Billy Johnson	1
(United States) Scuderia Corsa	Ferrari 458 Italia GT3	Ferrari F136 4.5 L V8	64	(United States) Rod Randall	1
(United States) Scuderia Corsa	Ferrari 458 Italia GT3	Ferrari F136 4.5 L V8	64	(Canada) Ken Wilden	1
(United States) Scuderia Corsa	Ferrari 458 Italia GT3	Ferrari F136 4.5 L V8	64	(Canada) Kyle Marcelli	4–5
(United States) Scuderia Corsa	Ferrari 458 Italia GT3	Ferrari F136 4.5 L V8	64	(Sweden) Stefan Johansson	4
(United States) Scuderia Corsa	Ferrari 458 Italia GT3	Ferrari F136 4.5 L V8	64	(Canada) Chris Cumming	5
(United States) Scuderia Corsa	Ferrari 458 Italia GT3	Ferrari F136 4.5 L V8	65	(Brazil) Marcos Gomes	1
(United States) Scuderia Corsa	Ferrari 458 Italia GT3	Ferrari F136 4.5 L V8	65	(Brazil) Francisco Longo	1
(United States) Scuderia Corsa	Ferrari 458 Italia GT3	Ferrari F136 4.5 L V8	65	(Brazil) Xandinho Negrão	1
(United States) Scuderia Corsa	Ferrari 458 Italia GT3	Ferrari F136 4.5 L V8	65	(Brazil) Daniel Serra	1
(United States) Park Place Motorsports	Porsche 911 GT America	Porsche 4.0 L Flat-6	71	(United States) Jim Norman	1–2, 4–5
(United States) Park Place Motorsports	Porsche 911 GT America	Porsche 4.0 L Flat-6	71	(United States) Craig Stanton	1, 4–5
(United States) Park Place Motorsports	Porsche 911 GT America	Porsche 4.0 L Flat-6	71	(Germany) Timo Bernhard	1
(United States) Park Place Motorsports	Porsche 911 GT America	Porsche 4.0 L Flat-6	71	(Austria) Norbert Siedler	1
(United States) Park Place Motorsports	Porsche 911 GT America	Porsche 4.0 L Flat-6	71	(United States) Mike Vess	2, 12
(United States) Park Place Motorsports	Porsche 911 GT America	Porsche 4.0 L Flat-6	71	(France) Kévin Estre	2
(United States) Park Place Motorsports	Porsche 911 GT America	Porsche 4.0 L Flat-6	71	(United States) Patrick Lindsey	2
(United States) Park Place Motorsports	Porsche 911 GT America	Porsche 4.0 L Flat-6	71	(United States) Mike Skeen	12
(United States) Park Place Motorsports	Porsche 911 GT America	Porsche 4.0 L Flat-6	73	(United States) Patrick Lindsey	All
(United States) Park Place Motorsports	Porsche 911 GT America	Porsche 4.0 L Flat-6	73	(France) Kévin Estre	1–2, 4–5, 8, 10–11, 13
(United States) Park Place Motorsports	Porsche 911 GT America	Porsche 4.0 L Flat-6	73	(United States) Mike Vess	1–2
(United States) Park Place Motorsports	Porsche 911 GT America	Porsche 4.0 L Flat-6	73	(United States) Connor De Phillippi	1
(United States) Park Place Motorsports	Porsche 911 GT America	Porsche 4.0 L Flat-6	73	(United States) Jason Hart	1
(United States) Park Place Motorsports	Porsche 911 GT America	Porsche 4.0 L Flat-6	73	(United States) Jim Norman	2, 7
(United States) Park Place Motorsports	Porsche 911 GT America	Porsche 4.0 L Flat-6	73	(Netherlands) Jaap van Lagen	7
(United States) Park Place Motorsports	Porsche 911 GT America	Porsche 4.0 L Flat-6	73	(United States) Mike Skeen	9, 13
(United States) Park Place Motorsports	Porsche 911 GT America	Porsche 4.0 L Flat-6	73	(Austria) Norbert Siedler	12–13
(Russia) SMP/ESM Racing	Ferrari 458 Italia GT3	Ferrari F136 4.5 L V8	72	(Russia) Mikhail Aleshin	1
(Russia) SMP/ESM Racing	Ferrari 458 Italia GT3	Ferrari F136 4.5 L V8	72	(Italy) Maurizio Mediani	1
(Russia) SMP/ESM Racing	Ferrari 458 Italia GT3	Ferrari F136 4.5 L V8	72	(Russia) Boris Rotenberg	1
(Russia) SMP/ESM Racing	Ferrari 458 Italia GT3	Ferrari F136 4.5 L V8	72	(Finland) Mika Salo	1
(Russia) SMP/ESM Racing	Ferrari 458 Italia GT3	Ferrari F136 4.5 L V8	72	(Russia) Sergey Zlobin	1
(United States) GB Autosport	Porsche 911 GT America	Porsche 4.0 L Flat-6	81	(Republic of Ireland) Damien Faulkner	All
(United States) GB Autosport	Porsche 911 GT America	Porsche 4.0 L Flat-6	81	(United States) Bob Faieta	1–2, 4
(United States) GB Autosport	Porsche 911 GT America	Porsche 4.0 L Flat-6	81	(Netherlands) Patrick Huisman	1
(United States) GB Autosport	Porsche 911 GT America	Porsche 4.0 L Flat-6	81	(United States) Michael Avenatti	1–2, 7
(United States) GB Autosport	Porsche 911 GT America	Porsche 4.0 L Flat-6	81	(United Kingdom) Ben Barker	5, 7–8, 10, 12–13
(United States) GB Autosport	Porsche 911 GT America	Porsche 4.0 L Flat-6	81	(United States) Matt Bell	9
(United States) GB Autosport	Porsche 911 GT America	Porsche 4.0 L Flat-6	81	(United States) Michael Lewis	11
(United States) GB Autosport	Porsche 911 GT America	Porsche 4.0 L Flat-6	81	(Austria) Philipp Eng	13
(United States) Turner Motorsport	BMW Z4 GT3	BMW P65B44 4.4 L V8	94	(United States) Dane Cameron	All
(United States) Turner Motorsport	BMW Z4 GT3	BMW P65B44 4.4 L V8	94	(Finland) Markus Palttala	1–2, 4–5, 7–8, 10–13
(United States) Turner Motorsport	BMW Z4 GT3	BMW P65B44 4.4 L V8	94	(Canada) Paul Dalla Lana	1–2, 9
(United States) Turner Motorsport	BMW Z4 GT3	BMW P65B44 4.4 L V8	94	(Brazil) Augusto Farfus	1
(United States) Turner Motorsport	BMW Z4 GT3	BMW P65B44 4.4 L V8	94	(United States) Shane Lewis	2
(United States) Turner Motorsport	BMW Z4 GT3	BMW P65B44 4.4 L V8	94	(Denmark) Christoffer Nygaard	13
(United States) TRG-AMR North America	Aston Martin V12 Vantage GT3	Aston Martin 6.0 L V12	007	(Australia) James Davison	All
(United States) TRG-AMR North America	Aston Martin V12 Vantage GT3	Aston Martin 6.0 L V12	007	(United States) Al Carter	1–2, 4–5, 7–12
(United States) TRG-AMR North America	Aston Martin V12 Vantage GT3	Aston Martin 6.0 L V12	007	(United States) David Block	1–2, 7, 13
(United States) TRG-AMR North America	Aston Martin V12 Vantage GT3	Aston Martin 6.0 L V12	007	(United States) Brandon Davis	1
(United States) TRG-AMR North America	Aston Martin V12 Vantage GT3	Aston Martin 6.0 L V12	007	(Denmark) Christina Nielsen	13
(United States) TRG-AMR North America	Aston Martin V12 Vantage GT3	Aston Martin 6.0 L V12	009	(Canada) Max Riddle	1–2
(United States) TRG-AMR North America	Aston Martin V12 Vantage GT3	Aston Martin 6.0 L V12	009	(United Kingdom) Jonathan Adam	1
(United States) TRG-AMR North America	Aston Martin V12 Vantage GT3	Aston Martin 6.0 L V12	009	(United Kingdom) Calum Lockie	1
(United States) TRG-AMR North America	Aston Martin V12 Vantage GT3	Aston Martin 6.0 L V12	009	(United States) Pete McIntosh II	1
(United States) TRG-AMR North America	Aston Martin V12 Vantage GT3	Aston Martin 6.0 L V12	009	(United States) Robert Nimkoff	1
(United States) TRG-AMR North America	Aston Martin V12 Vantage GT3	Aston Martin 6.0 L V12	009	(United States) Brandon Davis	2
(United States) TRG-AMR North America	Aston Martin V12 Vantage GT3	Aston Martin 6.0 L V12	009	(United States) Kris Wilson	2
(United States) Level 5 Motorsports	Ferrari 458 Italia GT3	Ferrari F136 4.5 L V8	555	(United States) Townsend Bell	1
(United States) Level 5 Motorsports	Ferrari 458 Italia GT3	Ferrari F136 4.5 L V8	555	(Italy) Alessandro Pier Guidi	1
(United States) Level 5 Motorsports	Ferrari 458 Italia GT3	Ferrari F136 4.5 L V8	555	(United States) Jeff Segal	1
(United States) Level 5 Motorsports	Ferrari 458 Italia GT3	Ferrari F136 4.5 L V8	555	(United States) Bill Sweedler	1
(United States) Level 5 Motorsports	Ferrari 458 Italia GT3	Ferrari F136 4.5 L V8	555	(United States) Scott Tucker	1
(United States) Level 5 Motorsports	Ferrari 458 Italia GT3	Ferrari F136 4.5 L V8	556	(United States) Terry Borcheller	1
(United States) Level 5 Motorsports	Ferrari 458 Italia GT3	Ferrari F136 4.5 L V8	556	(United States) Guy Cosmo	1
(United States) Level 5 Motorsports	Ferrari 458 Italia GT3	Ferrari F136 4.5 L V8	556	(United States) Mike LaMarra	1
(United States) Level 5 Motorsports	Ferrari 458 Italia GT3	Ferrari F136 4.5 L V8	556	(United States) Scott Tucker	1
(United States) Level 5 Motorsports	Ferrari 458 Italia GT3	Ferrari F136 4.5 L V8	556	(Costa Rica) Emilio Valverde	1
(Canada) AIM Autosport	Ferrari 458 Italia GT3	Ferrari F136 4.5 L V8	555	(United States) Townsend Bell	2, 4–5, 7–13
(Canada) AIM Autosport	Ferrari 458 Italia GT3	Ferrari F136 4.5 L V8	555	(United States) Bill Sweedler	2, 4–5, 7–13
(Canada) AIM Autosport	Ferrari 458 Italia GT3	Ferrari F136 4.5 L V8	555	(Italy) Maurizio Mediani	2
(Canada) AIM Autosport	Ferrari 458 Italia GT3	Ferrari F136 4.5 L V8	555	(United States) Jeff Segal	2
(Canada) AIM Autosport	Ferrari 458 Italia GT3	Ferrari F136 4.5 L V8	555	(United States) Conrad Grunewald	13

== Results and standings ==
Bold indicates overall winner.

- In Laguna Seca, there were two overall winners: one from race which included Prototype and GTLM classes, and other from race which included PC and GTD classes.
- In Kansas, there was one overall winner from two combined races which included PC class only.
- In Virginia, there were also two overall winners: one from two combined races which included PC class only, and other from race which included GTLM and GTD classes.

Rnd	Circuit	Prototype Winning Team	PC Winning Team	GTLM Winning Team	GTD Winning Team	Report
Rnd	Circuit	Prototype Winning Drivers	PC Winning Drivers	GTLM Winning Drivers	GTD Winning Drivers	Report
1	Daytona	**(United States) No. 5 Action Express Racing**	(United States) No. 54 CORE Autosport	(United States) No. 911 Porsche North America	(United States) No. 555 Level 5 Motorsports	Report
1	Daytona	**(Portugal) João Barbosa** **(France) Sébastien Bourdais** **(Brazil) Christian Fittipaldi**	(United States) Jon Bennett (United States) Colin Braun (United States) James Gue (Canada) Mark Wilkins	(Austria) Richard Lietz (France) Patrick Pilet (United Kingdom) Nick Tandy	(United States) Townsend Bell (Italy) Alessandro Pier Guidi (United States) Jeff Segal (United States) Bill Sweedler (United States) Scott Tucker	Report
2	Sebring	**(United States) No. 01 Chip Ganassi Racing**	(United States) No. 54 CORE Autosport	(United States) No. 912 Porsche North America	(United States) No. 44 Magnus Racing	Report
2	Sebring	**(United Kingdom) Marino Franchitti** **(United States) Scott Pruett** **(Mexico) Memo Rojas**	(United States) Jon Bennett (United States) Colin Braun (United States) James Gue	(Germany) Jörg Bergmeister (Denmark) Michael Christensen (United States) Patrick Long	(United States) Andy Lally (United States) John Potter (Germany) Marco Seefried	Report
3	Long Beach	**(United States) No. 01 Chip Ganassi Racing**	did not participate	(United States) No. 3 Corvette Racing	did not participate	Report
3	Long Beach	**(United States) Scott Pruett** **(Mexico) Memo Rojas**	did not participate	(Spain) Antonio García (Denmark) Jan Magnussen	did not participate	Report
4	Laguna Seca	**(United States) No. 2 Extreme Speed Motorsports**	**(United States) No. 8 Starworks Motorsport**	(United States) No. 3 Corvette Racing	(United States) No. 94 Turner Motorsport	Report
4	Laguna Seca	**(United States) Ed Brown** **(United States) Johannes van Overbeek**	**(Germany) Mirco Schultis** **(Netherlands) Renger van der Zande**	(Spain) Antonio García (Denmark) Jan Magnussen	(United States) Dane Cameron (Finland) Markus Palttala	Report
5	Belle Isle	**(United States) No. 10 Wayne Taylor Racing**	did not participate	did not participate	(United States) No. 63 Scuderia Corsa	Report
5	Belle Isle	**(United States) Jordan Taylor** **(United States) Ricky Taylor**	did not participate	did not participate	(Italy) Alessandro Balzan (United States) Jeff Westphal	Report
6	Kansas	did not participate	**(United States) No. 54 CORE Autosport**	did not participate	did not participate	Report
6	Kansas	did not participate	**(United States) Jon Bennett** **(United States) Colin Braun**	did not participate	did not participate	Report
7	Watkins Glen	**(United States) No. 90 Spirit of Daytona Racing**	(United States) No. 54 CORE Autosport	(United States) No. 3 Corvette Racing	(United States) No. 94 Turner Motorsport	Report
7	Watkins Glen	**(Canada) Michael Valiante** **(United Kingdom) Richard Westbrook**	(United States) Jon Bennett (United States) Colin Braun (United States) James Gue	(Spain) Antonio García (Denmark) Jan Magnussen	(United States) Dane Cameron (Finland) Markus Palttala	Report
8	Mosport	**(France) No. 42 OAK Racing**	did not participate	(United States) No. 3 Corvette Racing	(United States) No. 33 Riley Motorsports	Report
8	Mosport	**(France) Olivier Pla** **(Colombia) Gustavo Yacamán**	did not participate	(Spain) Antonio García (Denmark) Jan Magnussen	(Netherlands) Jeroen Bleekemolen (United States) Ben Keating	Report
9	Indianapolis	**(United States) No. 5 Action Express Racing**	(United States) No. 08 RSR Racing	(United States) No. 93 SRT Motorsports	(United States) No. 63 Scuderia Corsa	Report
9	Indianapolis	**(Portugal) João Barbosa** **(Brazil) Christian Fittipaldi**	(Canada) Chris Cumming (United Kingdom) Jack Hawksworth	(United States) Jonathan Bomarito (Canada) Kuno Wittmer	(Italy) Alessandro Balzan (United States) Jeff Westphal	Report
10	Road America	**(United States) No. 5 Action Express Racing**	(United States) No. 8 Starworks Motorsport	(United States) No. 62 Risi Competizione	(United States) No. 94 Turner Motorsport	Report
10	Road America	**(Portugal) João Barbosa** **(Brazil) Christian Fittipaldi**	(Germany) Mirco Schultis (Netherlands) Renger van der Zande	(Italy) Giancarlo Fisichella (Germany) Pierre Kaffer	(United States) Dane Cameron (Finland) Markus Palttala	Report
11	Virginia	did not participate	**(United States) No. 25 8Star Motorsports**	**(United States) No. 62 Risi Competizione**	(United States) No. 94 Turner Motorsport	Report
11	Virginia	did not participate	**(Mexico) Luis Díaz** **(United States) Sean Rayhall**	**(Italy) Giancarlo Fisichella** **(Germany) Pierre Kaffer**	(United States) Dane Cameron (Finland) Markus Palttala	Report
12	Austin	**(United States) No. 01 Chip Ganassi Racing**	(United States) No. 25 8Star Motorsports	(United States) No. 93 SRT Motorsports	(United States) No. 33 Riley Motorsports	Report
12	Austin	**(United States) Scott Pruett** **(Mexico) Memo Rojas**	(Mexico) Luis Díaz (United States) Sean Rayhall	(United States) Jonathan Bomarito (Canada) Kuno Wittmer	(Netherlands) Jeroen Bleekemolen (United States) Ben Keating	Report
13	Road Atlanta	**(United States) No. 10 Wayne Taylor Racing**	(United States) No. 8 Starworks Motorsport	(United States) No. 17 Team Falken Tire	(United States) No. 48 Paul Miller Racing	Report
13	Road Atlanta	**(Italy) Max Angelelli** **(United States) Jordan Taylor** **(United States) Ricky Taylor**	(Australia) John Martin (Venezuela) Alex Popow (Germany) Mirco Schultis (Netherlands) Renger van der Zande	(Germany) Wolf Henzler (Germany) Marco Holzer (United States) Bryan Sellers	(United Kingdom) Matthew Bell (Germany) Christopher Haase (United States) Bryce Miller	Report

== Championship standings ==
Championship points are awarded based on finishing positions as shown below. The points system from the Rolex Sports Car Series has been carried over into the new series.

Position	1	2	3	4	5	6	7	8	9	10	11	12	13	14	15	16	17	18	19	20	21	22	23	24	25	26	27	28	29	30
Race	35	32	30	28	26	25	24	23	22	21	20	19	18	17	16	15	14	13	12	11	10	9	8	7	6	5	4	3	2	1

Additionally, each driver who competes in a race, receives one point.

=== Prototype ===
==== Drivers ====
João Barbosa and Christian Fittipaldi won the championship at Petit Le Mans.

Pos	Driver	DAY	SEB	LBH	LGA	BEL	WGL	MOS	IMS	ELK	AUS	ATL	Points
1	(Portugal) João Barbosa	1	3	3	4	6	3	4	1	1	3	2	349
1	(Brazil) Christian Fittipaldi	1	3	3	4	6	3	4	1	1	3	2	349
2	(United States) Jordan Taylor	2	7	2	2	1	5	3	4	10	7	1	330
2	(United States) Ricky Taylor	2	7	2	2	1	5	3	4	10	7	1	330
3	(United Kingdom) Richard Westbrook	4	10	5	5	**2**	1	2	3	4	6	7	318
3	(Canada) Michael Valiante	4	10	5	5	2	1	2	3	4	6	7	318
4	(United States) Scott Pruett	11	1	**1**	3	11	8	9	2	7	1	3	317
5	(Colombia) Gustavo Yacamán	6	4	4	8	3	2	**1**	8	11	2	9†	287
6	(Mexico) Memo Rojas	11	1	1	3	11	8	9	2†	7	1	3	285
7	(Brazil) Oswaldo Negri Jr.	12	9	9	10	4	7	5	6	2	5	6	281
7	(United States) John Pew	12	9	9	10	4	7	5	6	2	5	6	281
8	(United States) Johannes van Overbeek	7	5	7	**1**	7	11	7	7	8	4		262
8	(United States) Ed Brown	7	5	7	1	7	11	7	7	8	4		262
9	(United Kingdom) Ryan Dalziel	15	2	6	11	5	10	8	**5**	**3**			228
9	(United States) Scott Sharp	15	2	6	11	5	10	8	5	3			228
10	(United States) Joel Miller	13	16	8	12	8	9	6	9	9	9	11†	222
11	(United States) Tristan Nunez	13	16†	8	12†	8	9	6	9	9	9	11	208
12	(Canada) Sylvain Tremblay	14	11	11†	7	9	13†	10	10	DNS	10	8	179
13	(United States) Eric Curran	10	12	10†	6	10†	6	DNS	11†	5	8	5	175
14	(France) Olivier Pla	6	4	4		3		1		11			172
15	(United Kingdom) Alex Brundle	5	4		8	2					2	9	169
16	(United States) Boris Said	10	12	10	6	10†	6	DNS			8	5	168
17	(United States) Burt Frisselle	3	8				4		11	5		10	154
18	(United States) Tom Long	14	11	11†	7	9	13†	10†	10	DNS	10†	8	137
19	(United Kingdom) Katherine Legge	16	15		9		12	DNS	6			4	131
20	(Italy) Max Angelelli	2	7				5					1	121
21	(United Kingdom) Andy Meyrick	16	15		9			DNS	6			4	111
22	(United States) Brian Frisselle	3	8				4					10	106
23	(United States) Sage Karam	11	6				8		2				104
24	(France) Sébastien Bourdais	1	3									2	100
25	(Colombia) Gabby Chaves	16	15				12					4	82
26	(New Zealand) Scott Dixon	8	6									3	81
27	(China) Ho-Pin Tung						2		8			9	80
28	(Germany) Mike Rockenfeller	4	10									7	76
29	(United Kingdom) Marino Franchitti	8	1										60
30	(France) Tristan Vautier	13	16				9					11†	59
31	(United States) Jon Fogarty	18†	8				4					10†	55
32	(France) Simon Pagenaud	7	5										52
33	(Australia) David Brabham	15	2										50
34	(Brazil) Tony Kanaan	8	6										50
35	(Italy) Max Papis	10										5	49
36	(Germany) Klaus Graf	5	13										46
36	(Germany) Lucas Luhr	5	13										46
37	(United States) Guy Cosmo		12				6						46
38	(United States) Anthony Lazzaro	7					11						46
39	(United Kingdom) Ben Devlin		11				13†					8	46
40	(United Kingdom) Justin Wilson	12	9										43
41	(United States) Byron DeFoor	9	14										41
41	(United Kingdom) David Hinton	9	14										41
41	(United States) Jim Pace	9	14										41
42	(South Africa) Wayne Taylor	2											33
43	(France) Fabien Giroix	3											31
43	(Australia) John Martin	3											31
44	(Venezuela) Alex Popow	17	17										30
45	(Russia) Roman Rusinov	6											26
45	(United Kingdom) Oliver Webb	6											26
46	(United States) Kyle Larson	8											24
47	(United States) Frank Beck	9											23
48	(United Kingdom) Bradley Smith	10											22
49	(United States) Jamie McMurray	11											21
50	(United States) A. J. Allmendinger	12											20
51	(United Kingdom) Jann Mardenborough		13										19
52	(Canada) James Hinchcliffe	14								12†			19
53	(United States) Alexander Rossi	16											16
54	(Colombia) Sebastián Saavedra	17	17†										16
55	(New Zealand) Brendon Hartley	17											15
55	(Venezuela) E. J. Viso	17											15
56	(United States) Memo Gidley	18											14
56	(United States) Alex Gurney	18											14
57	(United States) Scott Mayer	17†	17†							12†			3
58	(Germany) Pierre Kaffer		17†										1
59	(United States) Darren Law	18†											1

Colour	Result
Gold	Winner
Silver	Second place
Bronze	Third place
Green	Points classification
Blue	Non-points classification
Blue	Non-classified finish (NC)
Purple	Retired, not classified (Ret)
Red	Did not qualify (DNQ)
Red	Did not pre-qualify (DNPQ)
Black	Disqualified (DSQ)
White	Did not start (DNS)
White	Withdrew (WD)
White	Race cancelled (C)
Blank	Did not practice (DNP)
Blank	Did not arrive (DNA)
Blank	Excluded (EX)

**Bold** - Pole position

Italics - Fastest lap

Notes

- Drivers denoted by a † did not complete sufficient laps in order to score points.

==== Teams ====
The No. 5 Action Express Racing won the championship at Petit Le Mans.

Pos.	Team	DAY	SEB	LBH	LGA	BEL	WGL	MOS	IMS	ELK	AUS	ATL	Total Points
1	No. 5 Action Express Racing	1	**3**	3	4	6	3	4	1	1	3	**2**	349
2	No. 10 Wayne Taylor Racing	2	7	2	2	1	5	3	4	10	7	1	330
3	No. 90 Spirit of Daytona Racing	4	10	5	5	**2**	1	2	3	4	6	7	318
4	No. 01 Chip Ganassi Racing	11	1	**1**	3	11	8	9	2	7	1	3	317
5	No. 42 OAK Racing	6	4	4	8	3	**2**	**1**	8	11	**2**	9	309
6	No. 60 Michael Shank Racing	12	9	9	10	4	7	5	6	2	5	6	281
7	No. 2 Extreme Speed Motorsports	7	5	7	**1**	7	11	7	7	8	4		262
8	No. 07 SpeedSource	13	16	8	12	8	9	6	9	9	9	11	242
9	No. 31 Marsh Racing	10	12	10	6	10	6	DNS	11	5	8	5	237
10	No. 1 Extreme Speed Motorsports	15	2	6	11	5	10	8	**5**	**3**			228
11	No. 70 SpeedSource	14	11	11	7	9	13	10	10	DNS	10	8	217
12	No. 0 DeltaWing Racing Cars	16	15		9		12	DNS		6		4	131
13	No. 9 Action Express Racing	3	8				4					10	106
14	No. 02 Chip Ganassi Racing	8	6										50
15	No. 78 Starworks Motorsport	17	17							12			50
16	No. 6 Muscle Milk Pickett Racing	5	13										46
17	No. 50 Fifty Plus Racing (Highway to Help)	9	14										41
18	No. 99 GAINSCO/Bob Stallings Racing	**18**											14

==== Engine manufacturers ====
Pos.	Engine	DAY	SEB	LBH	LGA	BEL	WGL	MOS	IMS	ELK	AUS	ATL	Total Points
1	Chevrolet	**1**	**3**	2	2	**1**	1	2	1	1	3	**1**	366
2	Ford	8	1	**1**	3	4	7	5	2	2	1	3	349
3	Honda	7	2	6	1	5	10	7	5	3	2	9	325
4	Mazda	13	11	8	7	8	9	6	9	9	9	4	300
5	Nissan	5	4	4	8	3	2	**1**	8	11			269

==== Chassis Manufactures ====
Pos.	Chassis	DAY	SEB	LBH	LGA	BEL	WGL	MOS	IMS	ELK	AUS	ATL	Total Points
1	Coyote	1	2	3	3	2	1	1	1	1	2	2	363
2	Dallara	2	3	2	1	1	2	2	3	3	3	1	353
3	Riley	3	1	1	2	3	3	3	2	2	1	3	351

=== Prototype Challenge ===
==== Drivers ====
Jon Bennett and Colin Braun won the championship at Circuit of the Americas.

Pos	Driver	DAY	SEB	LGA	KAN	WGL	IMS	ELK	VIR	AUS	ATL	Points
1	(United States) Jon Bennett	1	1	7	1	1	3	8	3	2	2	321
1	(United States) Colin Braun	**1**	1	7	1	**1**	**3**	8	3	2	2	321
2	(Netherlands) Renger van der Zande	5	3	1	2	7	10†	1	6	3	1	282
3	(Mexico) Martin Fuentes	6	3	9	7	5	8	5	5	9	5	260
4	(United States) Frankie Montecalvo	4	9†	4	4	3	5	7	8	4	3	255
4	(United States) Gunnar Jeannette	4	9†	4	4	3	5	7	8	4	3	255
5	(Canada) Chris Cumming	8†	7	5	**5**	8	1	4	9	5	4	248
6	(United States) Sean Rayhall	7†	5†	2	3	10	6	2	**1**	**1**	7	244
7	(United States) Chris Miller		4	6	10	6	7	3	7	7	6	235
8	(Germany) Mirco Schultis	5		1	2	7	10†	1	6	3	1†	216
9	(South Africa) Stephen Simpson		4	6	10	6	7	3		7	6	210
10	(Brazil) Bruno Junqueira	9†	**2**	**3**	6	9	2	**9**†	4	11†	9	201
10	(United States) Duncan Ende	9†	2	3	6	9	2	9†	4	11†	9	201
11	(Canada) David Ostella	3	10†	8	9	4	4	6	2	10†	10†	198
12	(Mexico) Luis Díaz			2	3		6	2	1	1		195
13	(United States) James Gue	1	1			1					2	141
14	(United Kingdom) Jack Hawksworth						1	4		5	4	121
15	(United States) James French						4	6	2	10	10†	111
16	(United Kingdom) Tom Kimber-Smith	2	5			10					7	107
17	(Canada) Alex Tagliani	8†	7†	5	5	8			9			103
18	(United Kingdom) Martin Plowman		6†			2	9†			6	8	85
19	(United States) Tomy Drissi	3†	6			6					8	77
20	(United States) Doug Bielefeld	7†	6	DNS	8	2†	9					75
21	(United States) David Cheng	4†	3			2					11†	66
22	(Venezuela) Alex Popow	6						5†		9†	1	64
23	(United States) Michael Marsal	2	5									60
24	(Denmark) David Heinemeier Hansson	9†	2								9	57
25	(Australia) John Martin					5	8†	5†		9†	5	57
26	(United States) Eric Lux	5	5†		10						7†	51
27	(Canada) Mark Wilkins	1										36
28	(United Kingdom) Robert Huff	2										33
28	(Venezuela) Enzo Potolicchio	2										33
29	(Brazil) Raphael Matos	3	10†									32
30	(Brazil) Júlio Campos	3										31
31	(United States) Mike Guasch	4	9†									30
32	(United States) Gerry Kraut		4									29
33	(United States) Mike Hedlund					4						29
34	(United Kingdom) Sam Bird	5	3†	9†								29
35	(Canada) Kyle Marcelli	6†							5			28
36	(United States) Ryan Eversley			DNS							5	27
36	(United States) Adam Merzon										5	27
37	(United States) Marc Drumwright									6	8†	27
38	(Germany) Pierre Kaffer	6										26
39	(Canada) Mikhail Goikhberg										6	26
40	(United States) Gaston Kearby	7	8†									26
41	(United Kingdom) Ryan Dalziel				7							25
42	(United States) Charlie Shears		10†	8								25
43	(United Kingdom) Johnny Mowlem									8	11†	25
43	(United States) Tom Papadopoulos									8	11†	25
44	(United States) Rusty Mitchell	8†	7†			8†					4†	4
45	(Estonia) Tõnis Kasemets	7†	8†									2
46	(Brazil) Gabriel Casagrande	3†										1
47	(Spain) Isaac Tutumlu	6†										1
48	(United States) Chapman Ducote		6†									1
49	(Australia) James Kovacic	7†										1
50	(United States) Conor Daly	8†										1
51	(United States) Bruce Hamilton		8†									1
52	(United States) Gustavo Menezes	9†										1
53	(United Kingdom) Ryan Lewis					9†						1
54	(United States) Jerome Mee										10†	1

Colour	Result
Gold	Winner
Silver	Second place
Bronze	Third place
Green	Points classification
Blue	Non-points classification
Blue	Non-classified finish (NC)
Purple	Retired, not classified (Ret)
Red	Did not qualify (DNQ)
Red	Did not pre-qualify (DNPQ)
Black	Disqualified (DSQ)
White	Did not start (DNS)
White	Withdrew (WD)
White	Race cancelled (C)
Blank	Did not practice (DNP)
Blank	Did not arrive (DNA)
Blank	Excluded (EX)

**Bold** - Pole position

Italics - Fastest lap

Notes

- Drivers denoted by a † did not complete sufficient laps in order to score points.
- The results shown from VIR are a compilation of both of the double-header segments based on total points earned.

==== Teams ====
Pos.	Team	DAY	SEB	LGA	KAN	WGL	IMS	ELK	VIR	AUS	ATL	Total Points
1	No. 54 CORE Autosport	**1**	1	7	1	**1**	**3**	8	3	2	2	321
2	No. 25 8Star Motorsports	2	5	2	3	10	6	2	**1**	**1**	7	302
3	No. 8 Starworks Motorsport	5	3	1	2	7	10†	1	6	3	1	282
4	No. 52 PR1/Mathiasen Motorsports	4	9†	4	4	3	5	7	8	4	3	255
5	No. 08 RSR Racing	8†	7	5	**5**	8	1	4	9	5	**4**	248
6	No. 85 JDC-Miller MotorSports		4	6	10	6	7	3	7	7	6	235
7	No. 7 Starworks Motorsport	6		9	7	5	8	5	5	9	5	229
8	No. 38 Performance Tech	3	10†	8	9	4	4	6	2	10	10†	218
9	No. 09 RSR Racing	9†	**2**	**3**	6	9	2	**9†**	4	11†	9	201
10	No. 88 BAR1 Motorsports		6	DNS	8	2	9	DNS	DNS	8	11†	130
11	No. 87 BAR1 Motorsports	7	8†							6	8	76

Notes

- Teams denoted by a † did not complete sufficient laps in order to score points.
- The results shown from VIR are a compilation of both of the double-header segments based on total points earned.

=== GTLM ===
==== Drivers ====
Kuno Wittmer won the championship at Petit Le Mans.

Pos	Driver	DAY	SEB	LBH	LGA	WGL	MOS	IMS	ELK	VIR	AUS	ATL	Points
1	(Canada) Kuno Wittmer	6	2	10	7	3	2	1	3	5	1	3	331
2	(United States) Jonathan Bomarito	6	2	10	7	3	2	1	3	5	**1**	6	326
3	(Spain) Antonio García	10	8	1	**1**	1	1	4	6	7	9	8	317
4	(Belgium) Marc Goossens	**3**	7	7	6	2	3	8	4	6	2	3	314
5	(Germany) Dominik Farnbacher	3	7	7	6	2	3	8	4	6	2	6	309
6	(Denmark) Michael Christensen	9	**1**	5	8	8	9	3	5	8	3	2	303
6	(United States) Patrick Long	9	1	5	8	8	9	3	5	8	3	2	303
7	(Germany) Dirk Müller	4	10	2	10	6	4	7	2	3	7	7	300
7	(United States) John Edwards	4	10	2	10	6	4	7	**2**	3	7	7	300
8	(United States) Bill Auberlen	2	3	6	2	10	6	6	8	4	6	10	298
8	(United Kingdom) Andy Priaulx	2	3	6	2	**10**	6	6	8	4	6	10	298
9	(Denmark) Jan Magnussen	10	8	**1**	1	1	1	4	6	7†	9	8	293
10	(United Kingdom) Oliver Gavin	5	6	3	5	4	6	5	7	9	10	4	291
10	(United States) Tommy Milner	5	6	3	5	4	6	5	7	9	10	4	291
11	(United Kingdom) Nick Tandy	1	9	4	9	5	5	10	10	10	11	5	279
12	(Germany) Wolf Henzler		5	8	4	9	8	9	9	2	8	1	266
12	(United States) Bryan Sellers		5	8	4	9	8	9	9	2	8	1	266
13	(Italy) Giancarlo Fisichella	11†	11†	9	3	7	10	2	1	1	4	11	258
14	(Germany) Pierre Kaffer				3	7	10	2	1	1	4	11	233
15	(Austria) Richard Lietz	1	9	4	9	5	5	10†	10	10†			189
16	(France) Patrick Pilet	1	9			5					5	5	140
17	(Sweden) Niclas Jönsson	7	4		11	11						9	119
17	(United States) Tracy Krohn	7	4		11	11						9	119
18	(Germany) Jörg Bergmeister	9	1								11	5	107
19	(United States) Ryan Hunter-Reay	3	7									3	87
20	(United Kingdom) Robert Bell	6	2									6	85
21	(Italy) Andrea Bertolini	7	4									9	77
22	(Germany) Dirk Werner	4	10									7	76
23	(United States) Joey Hand	2	3									10†	76
24	(Germany) Marco Holzer		5									1	65
25	(United Kingdom) Robin Liddell	5	6										53
26	(Australia) Ryan Briscoe	10	8									4†	47
27	(Italy) Gianmaria Bruni	11	11										42
28	(Belgium) Maxime Martin	2											33
29	(New Zealand) Earl Bamber											2	33
30	(United States) Graham Rahal	4											29
31	(France) Frédéric Makowiecki										5		27
32	(United Kingdom) Peter Dumbreck	7											25
32	(United States) Jordan Taylor									7			25
34	(Canada) Paul Dalla Lana	8											24
34	(Portugal) Pedro Lamy	8											24
34	(Germany) Stefan Mücke	8											24
34	(New Zealand) Richie Stanaway	8											24
34	(United Kingdom) Darren Turner	8											24
35	(United States) Dane Cameron			9									23
36	(Italy) Matteo Malucelli	11†	11										22
37	(Monaco) Olivier Beretta	11†										11†	2

Colour	Result
Gold	Winner
Silver	Second place
Bronze	Third place
Green	Points classification
Blue	Non-points classification
Blue	Non-classified finish (NC)
Purple	Retired, not classified (Ret)
Red	Did not qualify (DNQ)
Red	Did not pre-qualify (DNPQ)
Black	Disqualified (DSQ)
White	Did not start (DNS)
White	Withdrew (WD)
White	Race cancelled (C)
Blank	Did not practice (DNP)
Blank	Did not arrive (DNA)
Blank	Excluded (EX)

**Bold** - Pole position

Italics - Fastest lap

Notes

- Drivers denoted by a † did not complete sufficient laps in order to score points.

==== Teams ====
The No. 93 SRT Motorsports won the championship at Petit Le Mans.

Pos.	Team	DAY	SEB	LBH	LGA	WGL	MOS	IMS	ELK	VIR	AUS	ATL	Total Points
1	No. 93 SRT Motorsports	6	2	10	7	3	**2**	1	3	5	1	6	326
2	No. 3 Corvette Racing	10	8	**1**	**1**	1	1	4	6	7	9	8	317
3	No. 91 SRT Motorsports	**3**	7	7	6	2	3	8	4	6	2	3	314
4	No. 912 Porsche North America	9	**1**	5	8	8	9	3	5	8	3	2	303
5	No. 56 BMW Team RLL	4	10	2	10	6	4	7	**2**	3	7	7	300
6	No. 62 Risi Competizione	11	11	9	3	7	10	**2**	1	**1**	4	11	298
7	No. 55 BMW Team RLL	2	3	6	2	**10**	6	6	8	4	6	10	298
8	No. 4 Corvette Racing	5	6	3	5	5	7	5	7	9	10	4	291
9	No. 911 Porsche North America	1	9	4	9	5	5	10	10	10	11	**5**	279
10	No. 17 Team Falken Tire		5	8	4	9	8	9	9	2	8	1	266
11	No. 57 Krohn Racing	7	4		11	11						9	119
12	No. 910 CORE Autosport										**5**		27
13	No. 97 Aston Martin Racing	8											24

==== Manufacturers ====
Pos.	Manufacturer	DAY	SEB	LBH	LGA	WGL	MOS	IMS	ELK	VIR	AUS	ATL	Total Points
1	Porsche	1	**1**	4	4	5	5	3	5	2	**3**	**1**	343
2	Dodge	**3**	2	7	6	2	**2**	1	3	5	1	3	340
3	Chevrolet	5	6	**1**	**1**	1	1	4	6	7	9	4	330
4	BMW	2	3	2	2	**6**	4	6	**2**	3	6	7	328
5	Ferrari	7	4	9	3	7	10	**2**	1	**1**	4	9	320

==== Tires ====
Pos.	Tire	DAY	SEB	LBH	LGA	WGL	MOS	IMS	ELK	VIR	AUS	ATL	Points
1	Michelin	1	1	1	1	1	1	1	1	1	1	2	382
2	Falken Tire		5	8	4	9	8	9	9	2	8	1	323

=== GTD ===
==== Drivers ====
Dane Cameron won the championship at Petit Le Mans.

Pos	Driver	DAY	SEB	LGA	BEL	WGL	MOS	IMS	ELK	VIR	AUS	ATL	Points
1	(United States) Dane Cameron	7†	**7**	1	6	1	3	**15**	1	1	3	4	304
2	(United States) Bryce Miller	16	12	2	3	8	8	2	11	4	6	1	295
2	(Germany) Christopher Haase	16	12	2	3	8	8	2	11	4	6	1	295
3	(United States) Leh Keen	8	4	4	5	**12**	5	5	2	5	5	8	295
3	(United States) Cooper MacNeil	8	4	4	5	12	5	5	2	5	5	8	295
4	(United States) Townsend Bell	1	2	14	8	2	13	4	5	8	8	7	293
4	(United States) Bill Sweedler	1	2	14	8	2	13	4	5	8	8	7	293
5	(United States) John Potter	12	1	3	13	3	9	12	14	6	2	3	289
6	(Finland) Markus Palttala	7†	7	1	6	1	3		1	1	3	4	287
7	(Belgium) Jan Heylen	3	9	11	9	13	7	11	3	9	4	2	280
7	(United States) Madison Snow	3	9	11	9	13	7	11	3	9	4	2	280
8	(United States) Andy Lally	12	1	3	13	3	9	12	14†	6	2	3	272
9	(United States) Jeff Westphal	11	18	7	1	5	17	1	16	2	11	9	269
10	(Germany) Mario Farnbacher	15	3	8	2	16	6	6	6	15	18	5	259
11	(South Africa) Dion von Moltke	5	5	5	13	7	14	13	8	7	13	12	252
12	(Venezuela) Nelson Canache Jr.	2	8	6	14	14	10	8	7	16	7	14	249
13	(Italy) Alessandro Balzan	10	17	7	1	5	17†	1	16†	2	11	9	240
14	(United States) Ben Keating	17	24	16	10	17	1	3	4	13	1	17	235
15	(United Kingdom) Ian James	13	3	8	2	16	6	6†	6	15	18	5	234
16	(United States) Spencer Pumpelly	2	8	6	14	14	10	8	7	16	7	14†	232
17	(Republic of Ireland) Damien Faulkner	27	10	17	9	9	4	16	12†	10	9	11	196
18	(Netherlands) Jeroen Bleekemolen	17	24	16	10	17†	1	3	4		1	17†	188
19	(United States) Brandon Davis	23	15	20	17	4	11	9	13†	3	14	18	178
20	(United States) Patrick Lindsey	13	20	9	18	19	2	10	10	17	10	13	173
21	(Australia) James Davison	20	21	13	4	11	12	7	DNS	12	19†	10	170
22	(United States) Seth Neiman	5	5	5	13	7	14	13†			13†	12	167
23	(United States) Al Carter	20	21	13	4	11	12	7	DNS	12	19		160
24	(United States) Patrick Dempsey	23	15	20		4†	11	9	13	3	14	18	153
25	(United States) Charles Espenlaub	29	6	22	15	10	16	14	9	11	DNS		145
26	(United Kingdom) Ben Barker				9	9	4		12		9	11	139
27	(United States) Charles Putman	29	6	22	15	10	16	14†	9†	11	DNS		106
28	(United Kingdom) Matthew Bell	14	12	18				16				1	104
29	(Germany) Marco Seefried	3	1									3	98
30	(Poland) Kuba Giermaziak	8	22	12	19		6				12	DNS	92
31	(France) Kévin Estre	26	20	9	18†		2		10	17†		13†	83
32	(United States) Brandon Davis	20	16			5						9	78
33	(Spain) Alex Riberas	13	3									5	77
34	(Denmark) Christina Nielsen	8	22			6						10	73
35	(United Kingdom) Alessandro Latif	5	8									12	71
36	(Venezuela) Henrique Cisneros	8	22	12	19						12		66
37	(Republic of Ireland) Matt Griffin	15	13			19†						6	63
37	(Italy) Michele Rugolo	15	13			18†						6	63
38	(South Africa) Jack Gerber	15	13	19		18							63
39	(Italy) Maurizio Mediani	4	2										62
40	(United States) Joe Foster	23	15			4						18	57
41	(United States) Mike Skeen							10			17	13	56
42	(Portugal) Filipe Albuquerque	5	5										54
43	(United States) Craig Stanton	21		15	DNS								52
44	(Germany) Sebastian Asch				12	3							51
45	(Switzerland) Philipp Frommenwiler		4			12							49
46	(United States) Mark Kvamme	18†		21				17		14		15	48
47	(Canada) Paul Dalla Lana	25	7					15					43
48	(United States) Andrew Palmer								8			14	42
49	(Canada) Kyle Marcelli		17†	10	16							9†	40
50	(United States) Bob Faieta	25	10	17									38
51	(United States) Jeff Segal	1	2†										37
52	(Italy) Lorenzo Casè	11	18										37
53	(Italy) Alessandro Pier Guidi	1											36
54	(Austria) Norbert Siedler	21	15†								10	13†	35
55	(United States) David Block	20	21			11						10†	35
56	(Germany) Markus Winkelhock	2	8†										34
56	(Italy) Gianluca Roda	16	14										34
56	(Italy) Paolo Ruberti	16	14										34
58	(United States) Tim Pappas												33
59	(United States) Brett Sandberg				17	14							33
60	(Italy) Piergiuseppe Perazzini	16										16	32
61	(United States) Jim Norman	21	20	15	DNS	19							30
62	(Russia) Mikhail Aleshin	4											29
62	(Finland) Mika Salo	4											29
62	(Russia) Sergey Zlobin	4											29
63	(United States) Terry Borcheller	6											26
63	(United States) Guy Cosmo	6											26
63	(United States) Mike LaMarra	6											26
63	(Costa Rica) Emilio Valverde	6											26
64	(Germany) Christopher Mies		6										26
65	(United States) Shane Lewis	8	7†										26
66	(Germany) Christian Engelhart	19	19										26
66	(Switzerland) Rolf Ineichen	19	19										26
67	(New Zealand) Shane van Gisbergen	7											25
68	(United States) Conrad Grunewald											7	25
69	(Canada) Max Riddle	24	16										25
70	(Denmark) Nicki Thiim	8											24
71	(United Kingdom) Marino Franchitti								9	11†			24
72	(United States) Michael Avenatti	27	10			9†							24
73	(Brazil) Marcos Gomes	9											23
73	(Brazil) Francisco Longo	9											23
73	(Brazil) Xandinho Negrão	9											23
73	(Brazil) Daniel Serra	9											23
74	(United States) Hugh Plumb		9										23
75	(Finland) Toni Vilander	11											22
76	(Sweden) Stefan Johansson			10									22
77	(Italy) Marco Bonanomi					10							22
78	(United States) Michael Lewis									10			22
79	(Germany) Marc Basseng	28	11										22
79	(United States) James Sofronas	28	11										22
79	(United States) Alex Welch	28	11										22
80	(Germany) Wolf Henzler	12											21
81	(Austria) Philipp Eng											11	21
82	(Canada) David Empringham	14											20
82	(Canada) John Farano	14											20
82	(Canada) Ken Wilden	14											20
83	(United States) Tomy Drissi				12								20
84	(Germany) Marco Holzer	15											19
85	(United States) Tony Ave									13			19
86	(Italy) Marco Cioci	15	13†										19
87	(Germany) René Rast	14											18
88	(Italy) Mirko Venturi		14										18
89	(United States) Corey Lewis									14			18
90	(United States) Mark Klenin								15		15†		18
91	(United States) Peter Ludwig					15							17
91	(Haiti) Patrick-Otto Madsen					15							17
92	(Canada) Chris Green						15						17
92	(Canada) Mark Thomas						15						17
93	(United States) Alec Udell										15		17
94	(United States) Larry Pegram										16	15†	17
95	(Netherlands) Sebastiaan Bleekemolen	17	24									17†	17
96	(Italy) Davide Rigon	16											16
97	(Canada) Chris Cumming				16								16
98	(United Arab Emirates) Khaled Al Qubaisi										16		16
99	(Australia) David Calvert-Jones			18		15†			17				16
100	(France) Emmanuel Collard	17											15
101	(United States) Randy Pobst	18						17†					15
102	(New Zealand) Earl Bamber	27	18									DNS	15
103	(United States) Robert Gewirtz	18											14
104	(Italy) Ruggero Melgrati		18										14
105	(Italy) Eddie Cheever III			19								16	14
106	(Austria) Klaus Bachler	19											13
106	(United States) Lance Willsey	19											13
107	(United States) Dillon Machavern			21									11
108	(United States) Pete McIntosh II	23											9
109	(United States) Ronald Zitza	27											8
110	(United States) Mike Vess	13†	20†								17†		3
111	(United States) Scott Tucker	1†											1
112	(Russia) Boris Rotenberg	4†											1
113	(Denmark) Christoffer Nygaard											4†	1
114	(Thailand) Pasin Lathouras											6†	1
115	(Canada) Louis-Philippe Dumoulin	8†											1
116	(United States) Matt Plumb		9†										1
117	(United States) Billy Johnson	14†											1
117	(United States) Rod Randall	14†											1
126	(Germany) Timo Bernhard	23†											1
127	(Germany) Marc Lieb	24†											1
128	(United Kingdom) Jonathan Adam	26†											1
128	(United Kingdom) Calum Lockie	26†											1
128	(United States) Robert Nimkoff	26†											1
129	(Italy) Eugenio Amos	27†											1
129	(United States) Bradley Blum	27†											1
129	(Switzerland) Alexandre Imperatori	27†											1
130	(Brazil) Augusto Farfus	7†											1
131	(United States) Connor De Phillippi	13†											1
131	(United States) Jason Hart	13†											1
132	(Netherlands) Patrick Huisman	25†											1
133	(Germany) Frank Stippler	28†											1
134	(United Kingdom) Oliver Jarvis	29†											1
134	(United Kingdom) James Walker	29†											1
135	(Belgium) Nico Verdonck		DNS										0

Colour	Result
Gold	Winner
Silver	Second place
Bronze	Third place
Green	Points classification
Blue	Non-points classification
Blue	Non-classified finish (NC)
Purple	Retired, not classified (Ret)
Red	Did not qualify (DNQ)
Red	Did not pre-qualify (DNPQ)
Black	Disqualified (DSQ)
White	Did not start (DNS)
White	Withdrew (WD)
White	Race cancelled (C)
Blank	Did not practice (DNP)
Blank	Did not arrive (DNA)
Blank	Excluded (EX)

**Bold** - Pole position

Italics - Fastest lap

Notes

- Drivers denoted by a † did not complete sufficient laps in order to score points.

==== Teams ====
The No. 94 Turner Motorsport team won the championship at Petit Le Mans.

Pos.	Team	DAY	SEB	LGA	BEL	WGL	MOS	IMS	ELK	VIR	AUS	ATL	Total Points
1	No. 94 Turner Motorsport	7†	**7**	1	6	1	3	**15**	1	1	3	4	304
2	No. 48 Paul Miller Racing	16	12	2	3	8	8	2	11	4	6	1	295
3	No. 22 Alex Job Racing	8	4	4	5	**8**	5	5	2	5	5	8	295
4	No. 555 AIM Autosport	1	2	14	8	2	13	4	5	8	8	7	293
5	No. 44 Magnus Racing	12	1	3	13	3	9	12	14	6	2	3	289
6	No. 58 Snow Racing	3	9	11	9	13	7	11	3	9	4	2	280
7	No. 63 Scuderia Corsa	**11**	18	7	1	5	17	1	16	2	11	9	269
8	No. 23 Team Seattle / Alex Job Racing	15	3	8	2	16	6	6	6	15	18	5	259
9	No. 35 Flying Lizard Motorsports	5	5	5	12	7	14	13	8	7	13	12	252
10	No. 45 Flying Lizard Motorsports	2	8	**6**	**14**	14	10	8	7	16	7	14	249
11	No. 33 Riley Motorsports	17	24†	16	11	17	**1**	3	4	13	1	17	235
12	No. 81 GB Autosport	25†	10	17	9	9	4	16	12	10	9	11	215
13	No. 27 Dempsey Racing	22	15	20	17	4	11	9	13	3	14	18†	195
14	No. 007 TRG-AMR North America	20	21†	13	4	11	12	7	**DNS**	**12**	**19**	**10**	182
15	No. 73 Park Place Motorsports	13†	20†	9	18	19†	2	10	10	17	10	13	173
16	No. 46 Fall-Line Motorsports	29†	6	22†	15	10	16	14	9		DNS		145
17	No. 18 Mühlner Motorsports America	27	DNS	18	12	15	15	DNS	17†	14	16	DNS	111
18	No. 30 NGT Motorsport	8	22†	12	19†	6					12	DNS	92
19	No. 19 Mühlner Motorsports America	18	18	21	DNS	DNS	DNS	17†	15	DNS	15	15	91
20	No. 51 Spirit of Race	15	13	19		18						6	89
21	No. 64 Scuderia Corsa	14		10	16								58
22	No. 49 Spirit of Race	16	14									16	50
23	No. 71 Park Place Motorsports	21	23†	15	DNS	DNS			DNS	DNS	17	DNS	44
24	No. 72 SMP/ESM Racing	4											29
25	No. 556 Level 5 Motorsports	6											26
26	No. 28 Dempsey Racing	19	19										26
27	No. 009 TRG-AMR North America	23	16										25
28	No. 65 Scuderia Corsa	9											23
29	No. 32 GMG Racing	28†	11										22

==== Manufacturers ====
Pos.	Manufacturer	DAY	SEB	LGA	BEL	WGL	MOS	IMS	ELK	VIR	AUS	ATL	Total Points
1	Porsche	3	1	3	2	3	2	5	2	3	2	2	343
2	BMW	7	**7**	1	6	1	3	15	1	1	3	4	340
3	Ferrari	**1**	2	7	1	2	13	1	5	2	8	6	337
4	Audi	2	5	2	**3**	7	8	2	7	4	6	1	329
5	Dodge	19	24	16	11	17	**1**	3	4	13	1	17	286
