= 2014 Kansas Grand Prix =

Sports Car race

The 2014 Grand Prix of Kansas was a sports car race sanctioned by the International Motor Sports Association (IMSA) held on the Kansas Speedway in Kansas City, Kansas on June 7, 2014. The event served as the sixth of thirteen scheduled rounds of the 2014 United SportsCar Championship.

== Background ==
=== Preview ===
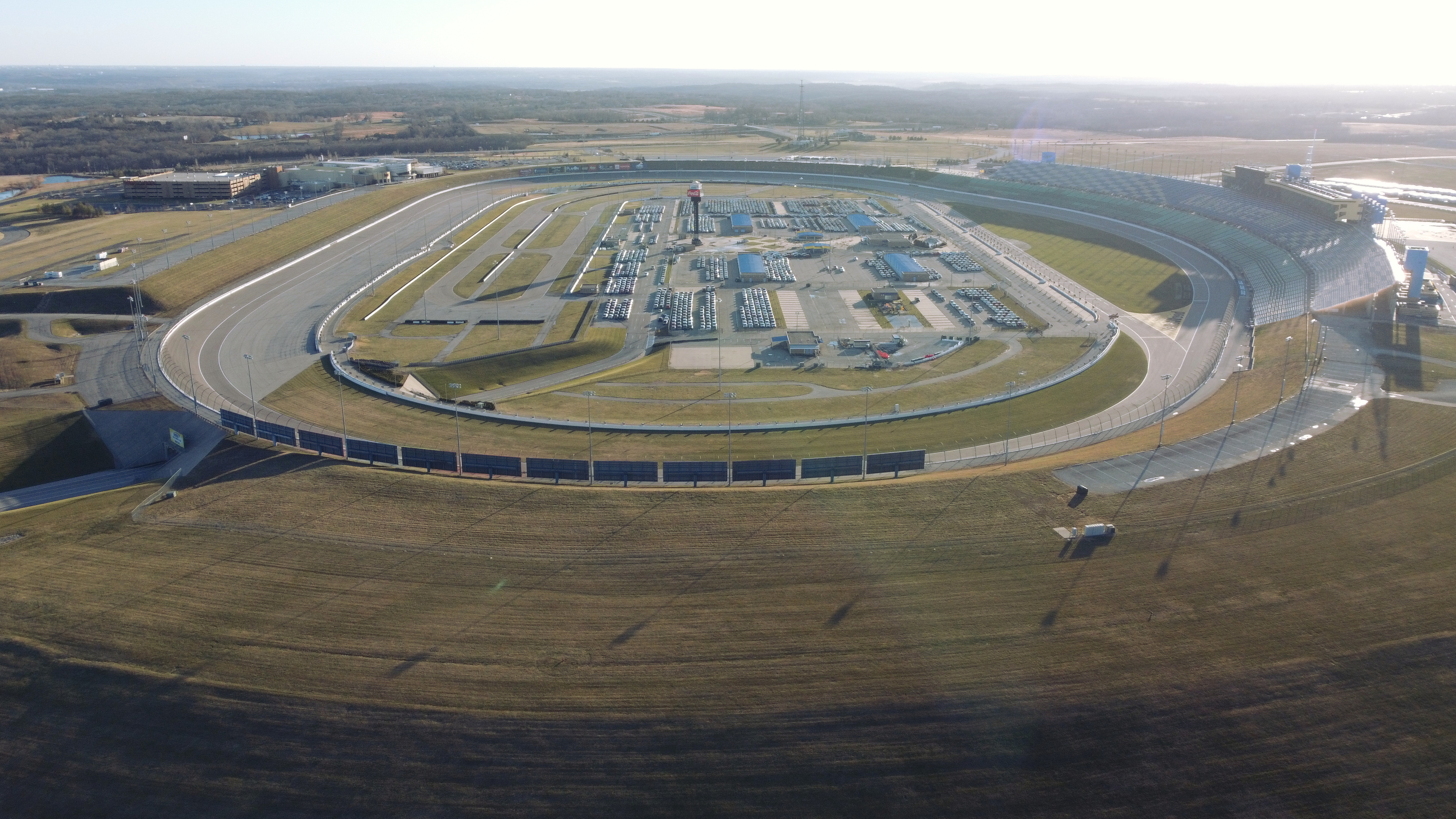
Kansas Speedway, where the race was held.

International Motor Sports Association (IMSA) president Scott Atherton confirmed that the race was part of the 2014 United SportsCar Championship schedule in October 2013. It was the first year the event was held as part of the Tudor United SportsCar Championship. The 2014 Grand Prix of Kansas was the sixth of thirteen scheduled sports car races of 2014 by IMSA, and it was the third round not held as part of the North American Endurance Cup. The event was held at the nineteen-turn 2.370 mi (3.814 km) Kansas Speedway in Kansas City, Kansas on June 7, 2014. The event was run in conjunction with the Cooper Tires Prototype Lites in a two-segment race format.

Before the race, Jon Bennett and Colin Braun led the Prototype Challenge Drivers' Championship with 97 points, 3 points clear of Renger van der Zande in second, and Martin Fuentes with 80 points. CORE Autosport were their respective Teams' Championships.

=== Entry list ===
Twenty-nine cars were officially entered for the Grand Prix of Kansas, with the bulk of entries in the Cooper Tires Prototype Lites series. The Prototype Challenge (PC) class was composed of ten Oreca FLM09 cars: two from Starworks Motorsport and RSR Racing. BAR1 Motorsports, CORE Autosport, JDC-Miller MotorSports, Performance Tech, PR1/Mathiasen Motorsports, and 8Star Motorsports entered one car each. With the absence of the Prototype (P), Grand Touring Le Mans (GTLM), and Grand Touring Daytona (GTD) categories from the field, only one racing class was represented in Kansas.

== Practice ==
There were three practice sessions preceding the start of the race on Saturday: all on Friday.The first session was on Friday afternoon lasted 80 minutes while the second session on Friday afternoon lasted one-hour. The third session on Final evening lasted 45 minutes

== Qualifying ==
Friday evening's 50-minute two-group qualifying session gave 15-minute sessions to all categories. Cars in Cooper Tires Prototype Lites were sent out first before those grouped in PC had one separate identically timed session. Regulations stipulated teams to nominate one qualifying driver, with the fastest laps determining each classes starting order.

=== Qualifying results ===
Pole positions in each class are indicated in bold and by ‡. PC stands for Prototype Challenge.

Pos.	Class	No.	Team	Time	Gap	Grid
1	**PC**	**08**	**(United States) RSR Racing**	**1:11.839**	**_**	1‡
2	PC	52	(United States) PR1/Mathiasen Motorsports	1:11.878	+0.039	2
3	PC	25	(United States) 8Star Motorsports	1:11.989	+0.150	3
4	PC	09	(United States) RSR Racing	1:12.541	+0.702	4
5	PC	54	(United States) CORE Autosport	1:12.597	+0.758	5
6	PC	38	(United States) Performance Tech	1:12.766	+0.927	6
7	PC	85	(United States) JDC-Miller MotorSports	1:12.862	+1.023	7
8	PC	8	(United States) Starworks Motorsport	1:12.958	+1.119	8
9	PC	7	(United States) Starworks Motorsport	1:13.592	+1.753	9
10	PC	88	(United States) BAR1 Motorsports	1:13.737	+1.898	10
11	**L1**	**27**	**Performance Tech Motorsport**	**1:16.183**	**+4.344**	11‡
12	L1	61	Comprent Motor Sports	1:16.308	+4.469	12
13	L1	16	Performance Tech Motorsport	1:16.393	+4.554	13
14	L1	9	Performance Tech Motorsport	1:16.482	+4.643	14
15	L1	12	ONE Motorsports	1:16.582	+4.743	15
16	L1	39	Performance Tech Motorsport	1:16.607	+4.768	16
17	L1	44	Ferrari of Houston Race Team	1:16.643	+4.804	17
18	L1	10	JDC Motorsports	1:16.737	+4.898	18
19	L1	77	ONE Motorsports	1:17.001	+5.162	19
20	L1	4	8Star Motorsports	1:17.109	+5.270	20
21	L1	2	8Star Motorsports	1:17.366	+5.527	21
22	L1	34	Performance Tech Motorsport	1:17.396	+5.557	22
23	L1	65	8Star Motorsports	1:17.995	+6.156	23
24	L1	42	Eurosport Racing	1:18.766	+6.927	24
25	L1	125	Performance Tech Motorsport	1:21.696	+9.857	25
26	**L2**	**22**	**BAR1 Motorsports**	**No Time Established**		26‡
27	L1	28	Yount Motorsports	No Time Established		27
28	L1	62	ONE Motorsports	No Time Established		28
29	L1	29	Extreme Speed Motorsports	No Time Established		29

== Race ==
=== Race results ===
Class winners are denoted in bold and ‡. PC stands for Prototype Challenge.

Pos	Class	No.	Team	Drivers	Chassis	Tire	Laps
Pos	Class	No.	Team	Drivers	Engine	Tire	Laps
1	**PC**	**54**	**(United States) CORE Autosport**	**(United States) Jon Bennett (United States) Colin Braun**	**Oreca FLM09**	C	**66‡**
1	**PC**	**54**	**(United States) CORE Autosport**	**(United States) Jon Bennett (United States) Colin Braun**	**Chevrolet 6.2 L V8**	C	**66‡**
2	PC	8	(United States) Starworks Motorsport	(Germany) Mirco Schultis (Netherlands) Renger van der Zande	Oreca FLM09	C	66
2	PC	8	(United States) Starworks Motorsport	(Germany) Mirco Schultis (Netherlands) Renger van der Zande	Chevrolet 6.2 L V8	C	66
3	PC	25	(United States) 8Star Motorsports	(Mexico) Luis Díaz (United States) Sean Rayhall	Oreca FLM09	C	66
3	PC	25	(United States) 8Star Motorsports	(Mexico) Luis Díaz (United States) Sean Rayhall	Chevrolet 6.2 L V8	C	66
4	PC	52	(United States) PR1/Mathiasen Motorsports	(United States) Gunnar Jeannette (United States) Frankie Montecalvo	Oreca FLM09	C	66
4	PC	52	(United States) PR1/Mathiasen Motorsports	(United States) Gunnar Jeannette (United States) Frankie Montecalvo	Chevrolet 6.2 L V8	C	66
5	PC	08	(United States) RSR Racing	(Canada) Chris Cumming (Canada) Alex Tagliani	Oreca FLM09	C	66
5	PC	08	(United States) RSR Racing	(Canada) Chris Cumming (Canada) Alex Tagliani	Chevrolet 6.2 L V8	C	66
6	PC	09	(United States) RSR Racing	(United States) Duncan Ende (Brazil) Bruno Junqueira	Oreca FLM09	C	66
6	PC	09	(United States) RSR Racing	(United States) Duncan Ende (Brazil) Bruno Junqueira	Chevrolet 6.2 L V8	C	66
7	PC	7	(United States) Starworks Motorsport	(Mexico) Martin Fuentes (United Kingdom) Ryan Dalziel	Oreca FLM09	C	66
7	PC	7	(United States) Starworks Motorsport	(Mexico) Martin Fuentes (United Kingdom) Ryan Dalziel	Chevrolet 6.2 L V8	C	66
8	PC	88	(United States) BAR1 Motorsports	(United States) Doug Bielefeld	Oreca FLM09	C	66
8	PC	88	(United States) BAR1 Motorsports	(United States) Doug Bielefeld	Chevrolet 6.2 L V8	C	66
9	PC	38	(United States) Performance Tech	(Canada) David Ostella	Oreca FLM09	C	66
9	PC	38	(United States) Performance Tech	(Canada) David Ostella	Chevrolet 6.2 L V8	C	66
10	PC	85	(United States) JDC-Miller MotorSports	(United States) Chris Miller (South Africa) Stephen Simpson	Oreca FLM09	C	65
10	PC	85	(United States) JDC-Miller MotorSports	(United States) Chris Miller (South Africa) Stephen Simpson	Chevrolet 6.2 L V8	C	65

Tyre manufacturers
Key
Symbol	Tyre manufacturer
**C**	Continental

United SportsCar Championship
Previous race: Chevrolet Sports Car Classic	2014 season	Next race: 6 Hours of The Glen
