= Pacific Racing Team =

Japanese auto racing team

(Japan) Pacific Racing Team
- Founded: October 2009
- Current series: Super GT
- Former series: D1 Grand Prix (2014–2018)
- Current drivers: (Japan) Yusuke Tomibayashi (Japan) Yuta Fujiwara (Japan) Rintaro Kubo
- Website: www.pacific-racing.jp

Pacific Racing Team is a Japanese auto racing team. As of 2026, the team fields the No. 9 BMW M4 GT3 Evo in Super GT's GT300 class.

Founded in 2009, the team has gone through multiple name changes throughout its history. It also competed in D1 Grand Prix from 2014 to 2018. Pacific Racing is based out of Nakanihon Automotive College, and often enlists its students to work on the cars.

The team is notable for its collaborations with anime, VTuber, and media franchises, which entail fielding cars with itasha-style liveries depicting their respective characters.

== History ==
Pacific Racing began as Pacific Promotion, an advertising agency founded in 2000 to promote solar cars. The company organized the first Silk Road Solar Car Crossing, which traveled through China, in 2001. Similar events took place in Hokkaido and Italy in 2003 and 2006, respectively.

After appearing at the 2009 Suzuka Pokka GT Summer Special, the company was reformed into Pacific Racing Team in October of that year. They partnered with French program Team LMP Motorsport for the 2010 Super GT Series. LMP Motorsport debuted with Yutaka Yamagishi and Hiroshi Koizumi driving a Ferrari F430. For the final rounds, the team added a Porsche 996 GT3-RS.

Pacific Promotion was formally renamed to Pacific Racing Team Inc. in March 2013. The team also competed as Pacific Direction Racing.

In 2014, the team began competing in D1 Grand Prix.

The team aligned with Gulf Racing's Japanese subsidiary in 2016 to create Gulf Racing with Pacific; they also replaced the outdated McLaren MP4-12C GT3 with a new Porsche 911 GT3 R. Although the season began with an engine fire, Pacific finished every race afterward with an eighth in the finale.

For the 2020 season, Pacific Racing partnered with D'station Racing, becoming Pacific – D'station Racing. As part of the deal, they began using the Aston Martin Vantage AMR GT3.

In 2021, the team formed an alliance with CarGuy Racing and returned to Ferrari, a joint effort called Pacific CarGuy Racing.

Pacific ended the CarGuy partnership after 2022 and switched to the Mercedes-AMG GT3 Evo. The new car crashed in a rain-plagued season opener at Okayama, forcing them to miss the next round in Fuji.

Ahead of 2026, Pacific started using the BMW M4 GT3. It marked BMW's return to Super GT after a year away. The team scored their maiden pole position and victory at Suzuka Circuit.

== Collaborations ==
Pacific Racing's collaborations

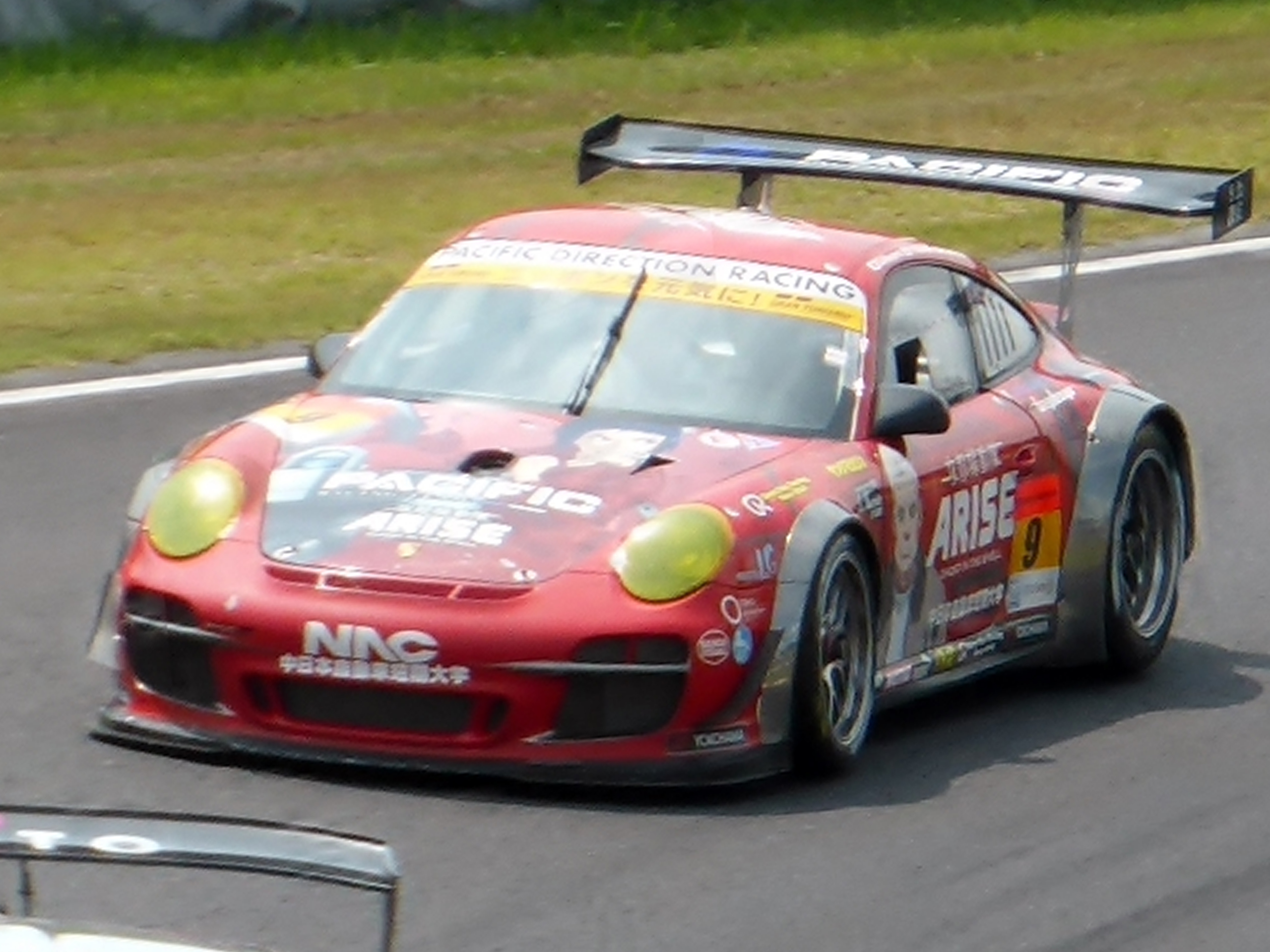
Ghost in the Shell: Arise, 2013

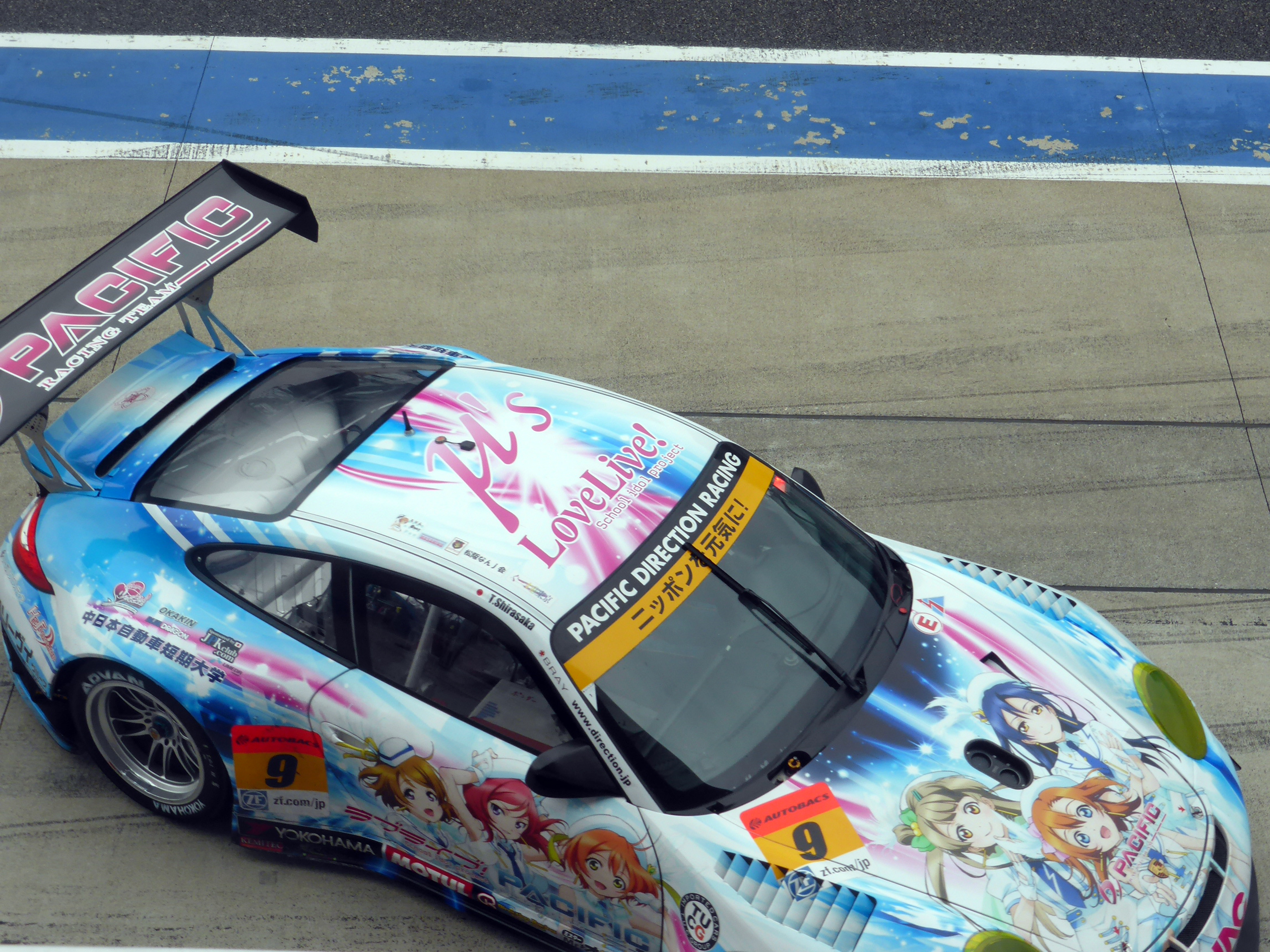
Love Live!, 2014

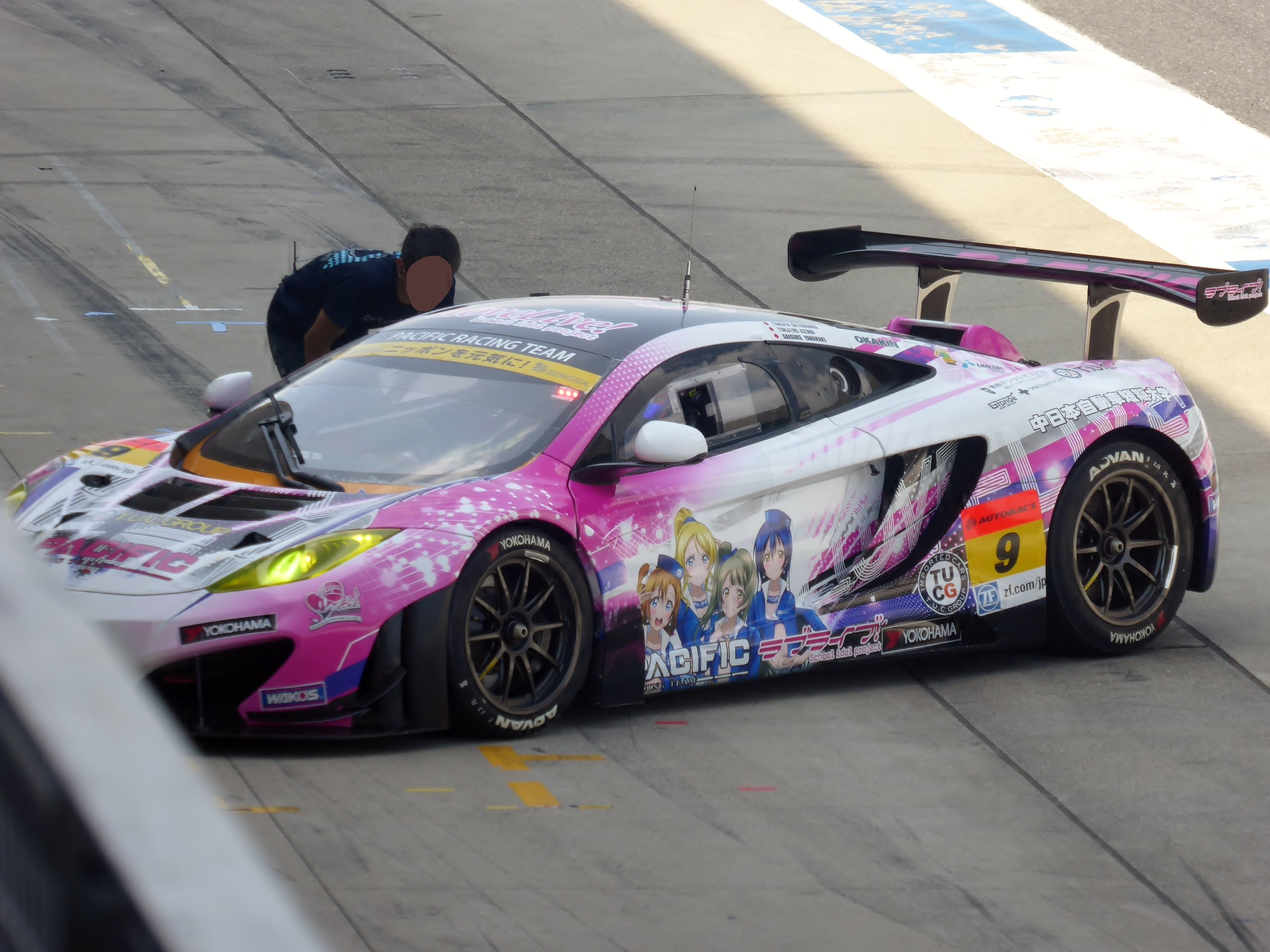
Love Live!, 2015

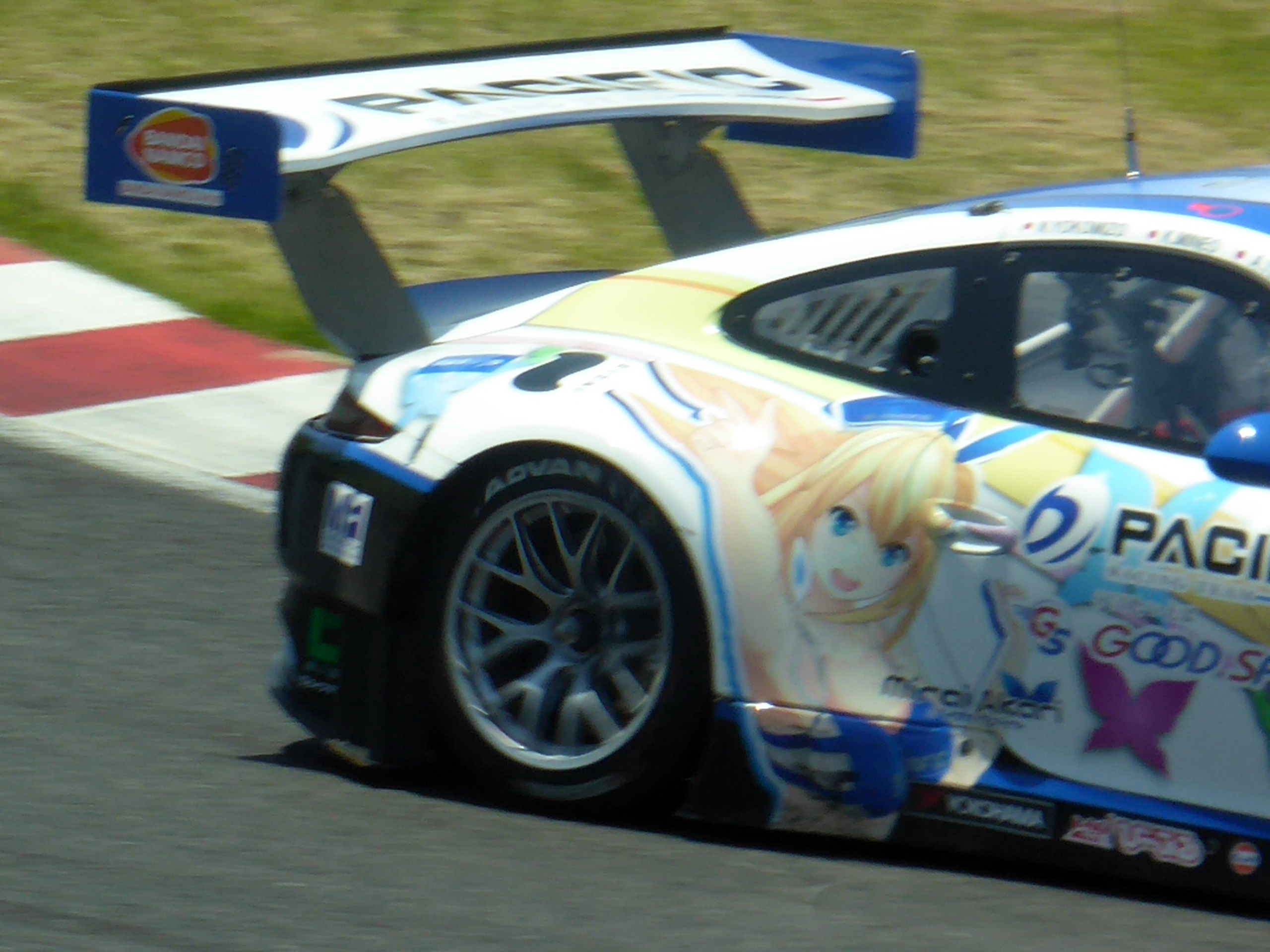
Mirai Akari, 2019

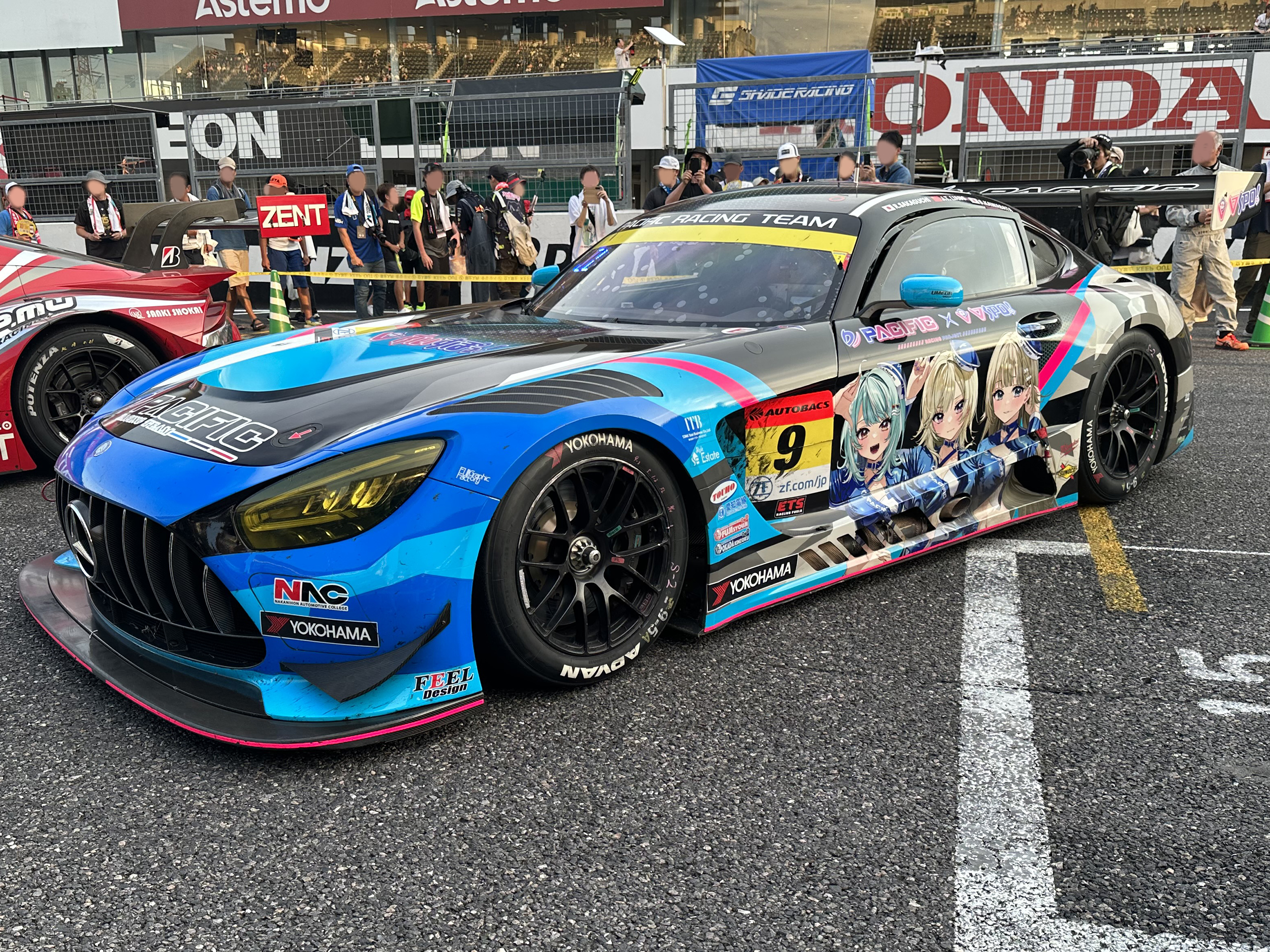
VSPO!, 2023

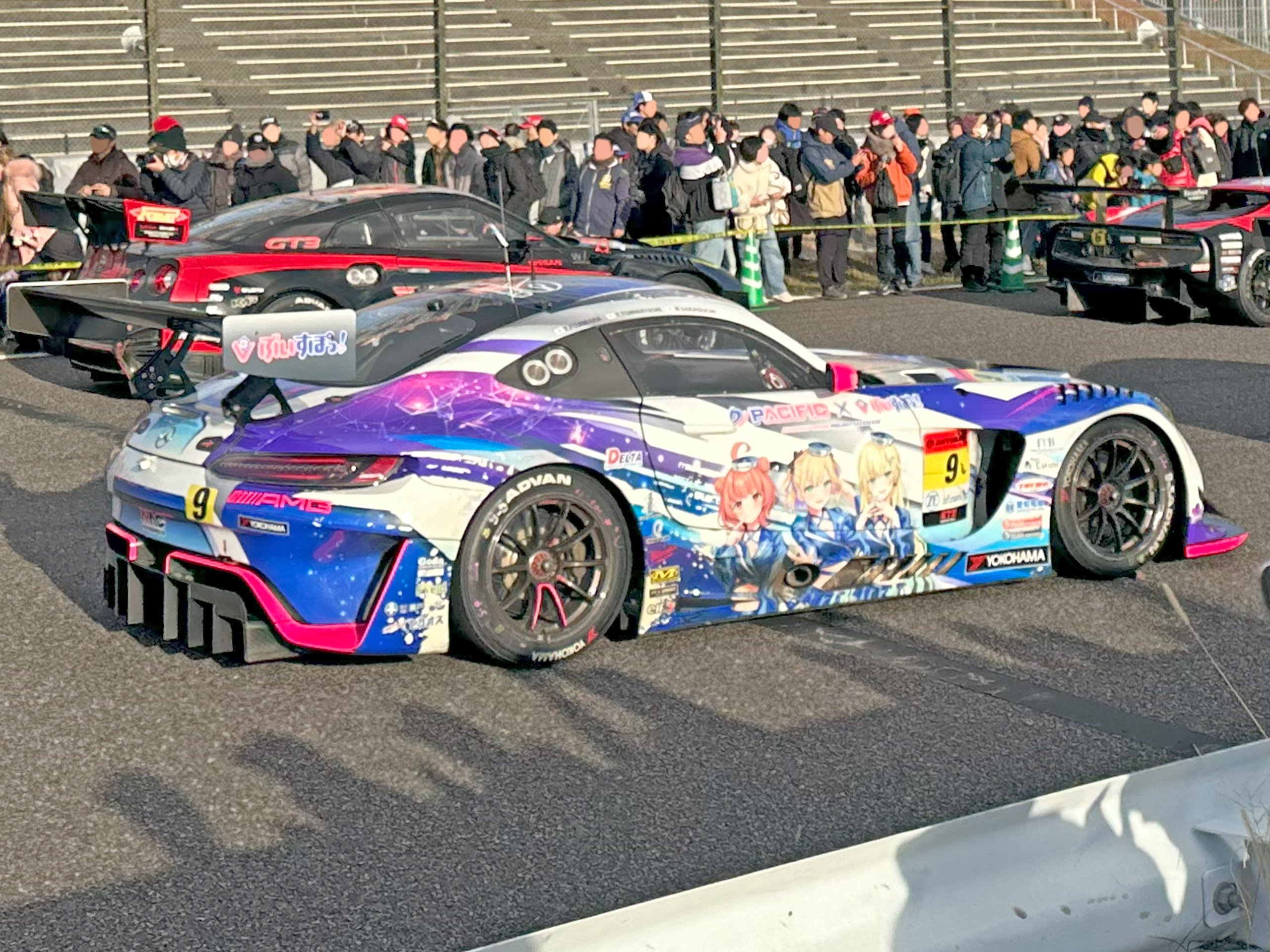
VSPO!, 2024

Umamusume, 2026

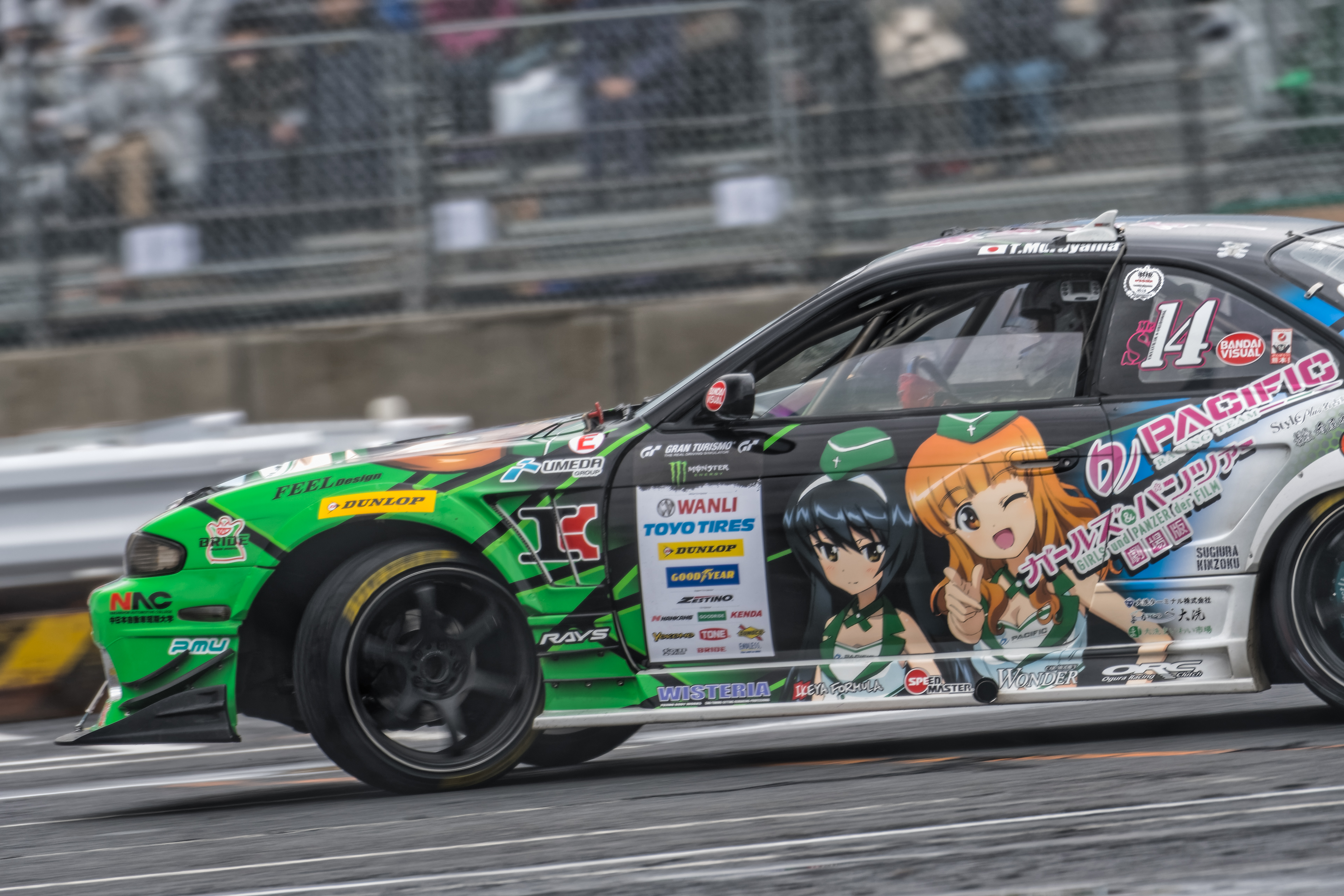
Girls und Panzer, 2017 (D1GP)

Pacific Racing frequently partners with media franchises such as anime and manga. As part of the collaborations, the main characters from each series are pictured on the vehicle liveries in the uniforms of the team's "Pacific Fairies" race queens. The team also sells corresponding merchandise like figurines and shirts. The campaigns are regarded as a major financial boon for the team, though it has also accepted individual donations and sponsorships. The car designs are comparable to itasha, or cars decorated with images of fictional characters. Fellow Super GT team Goodsmile Racing has a similar concept as their cars are predominantly adorned with Hatsune Miku, and has been considered a quasi-rival of Pacific Racing since they are in the same class.

The team's first collaboration was with the manga Squid Girl in 2011 and 2012. It had received an anime adaptation the year prior that was directed by Tsutomu Mizushima, who served as Pacific's supervisor and manager. The titular character was depicted on the sides of the team's Ferrari.

In 2013, Ghost in the Shell: Arise became Pacific's new collaboration. The team's No. 27 was renumbered to No. 9 as a reference to the show's Public Security Section 9, while the livery was changed from white to red to match the Tachikoma in Arise. Mitsuhisa Ishikawa, founder of studio Production I.G, felt the story of the show's protagonist Motoko Kusanagi "overlaps with Pacific Racing's performance on the track".

The Ghost in the Shell sponsorship ended before the 2014 season. In its place, the team partnered with anime series Love Live!. All nine members of μ's from School Idol Project appeared on both the Super GT Porsche and the D1GP Toyota 86, which featured similar liveries. The collaboration was renewed for 2015, this time appearing on the team's McLaren and Nissan.

While the Super GT division did not have a collaboration from 2016 to 2018, the D1 Grand Prix arm received one annually during its existence. Besides Love Live!, the D1GP program fielded cars bearing liveries from the anime Girls und Panzer starting in 2015. The merchandise offered was also military-themed like camouflage bags and "war memorial" and "war cry" packages containing stickers, charms, and towels.

After three years without a Super GT sponsorship, Pacific partnered with VTuber Mirai Akari in 2019.

Pacific continued working with VTubers in 2022 via partnership with Hololive Production. Featured on the team's car were the personalities Tokino Sora, Houshou Marine, Aki Rosenthal, Shirakami Fubuki, Oozora Subaru, and Yukihana Lamy.

Virtual eSports Project (VSPO!), another VTuber agency, became Pacific's new collaboration in 2023. Yakumo Beni, Komori Met, Shiranami Ramune, Kaga Sumire, Nekota Tsuna, and Hanabusa Lisa were featured. The 2024 collaboration used Tachibana Hinano, Yumeno Akari, Kurumi Noah, Kaminari Qpi, Aizawa Ema, and Kaga Nazuna.

For the 2025 season, Pacific collaborated with The Idolmaster. Each of the franchise's six projects was represented by a character: Makoto Kikuchi (The Idolmaster), Minami Nitta (Cinderella Girls), Kaori Sakuramori (Million Live!), Hokuto Ijūin (SideM), Natsuha Arisugawa (Shiny Colors), and Sena Jūō (Gakuen Idolmaster).

In 2026, Umamusume: Pretty Derby served as the team's feature sponsor. Special Week, Buena Vista, Curren Chan, Maruzensky, Rice Shower, and Winning Ticket appeared on the car; the real-life racehorses whom the featured characters are based on descended from the same lineage.

=== Chronology ===
Year	Collaboration	Ref
Super GT
2011	Squid Girl	
2013	Ghost in the Shell: Arise	
2014	Love Live!	
2015	Love Live!	
2019	Mirai Akari	
2022	Hololive Production	
2023	VSPO!	
2024	VSPO!	
2025	The Idolmaster	
2026	Umamusume: Pretty Derby	
D1 Grand Prix
2014	Love Live!	
2015	Love Live!	
2015	Girls und Panzer	
2016	Girls und Panzer	
2017	Girls und Panzer	
2018	Girls und Panzer	

== Results ==
=== Super GT ===
(key) (Races in bold indicate pole position) (Races in italics indicate fastest lap)

Year	Car	Tyres	Class	No.	Drivers	1	2	3	4	5	6	7	8	9	Pos.	Points
2010	Ferrari F430	Y	GT300	27	(Japan) Yutaka Yamagishi (Japan) Hiroshi Koizumi	SUZ; 9	OKA; 11	FUJ; 8	SEP; 10	SUG; DNS	SUZ; 7	FUJ; C	MOT; 13		13th	26
2010	Porsche 996 GT3-RS	Y	GT300	28	(Japan) Akihiro Asai (Japan) Yuki Iwasaki	SUZ	OKA	FUJ	SEP	SUG	SUZ; 11	FUJ; C	MOT; 15		23rd	4
2011	Ferrari F430	Y	GT300	27	(Japan) Yutaka Yamagishi (Japan) Hideki Yamauchi (1–6) (Netherlands) Carlo van Dam (7–8)	OKA; 5	FUJ; 11	SEP; 3	SUG; Ret	SUZ; 11	FUJ; 7	AUT; 10	MOT; 14		13th	41
2012	Ferrari F430 GTC	Y	GT300	27	(Japan) Yutaka Yamagishi (Japan) Takuto Iguchi	OKA; 10	FUJ; 17	SEP; 13	SUG; 18	SUZ; 8	FUJ; 14	AUT; 9	MOT; 14		18th	19
2013	Porsche 911 GT3-R	Y	GT300	9	(Japan) Shogo Mitsuyama (1–8) (Japan) You Yokomaku (1–2, 4–8) (Japan) Hisao Shigeta (3) (Japan) Yuya Sakamoto (5)	OKA; 19	FUJ; 14	SEP; 19	SUG; 21	SUZ; 14	FUJ; 21	AUT; 19	MOT; 19		24th	8
2014	Porsche 911 GT3	Y	GT300	9	(Japan) Takuya Shirasaka (1–6, 8) (Japan) Yuya Sakamoto (1–2, 8) (Japan) Taiyo Iida (2, 6) (Macau) André Couto (3–6)	OKA; 12	FUJ; 13	AUT; 19	SUG; 17	FUJ; 15	SUZ; 7	CHA	MOT; 9		19th	18
2015	McLaren MP4-12C GT3	Y	GT300	9	(Japan) Takuya Shirasaka (1–2, 4–8) (Japan) Tohjiro Azuma (1–2) (Japan) Daisuke Yamawaki (2, 5) (Japan) Ryohei Sakaguchi (4–8)	OKA; 23	FUJ; Ret	CHA	FUJ; 16	SUZ; 22	SUG; 23	AUT; 20	MOT; Ret		27th	5
2016	Porsche 911 GT3 R	Y	GT300	9	(Japan) Ryohei Sakaguchi (Japan) Hiroki Yoshida (Belgium) Dylan Derdaele (2)	OKA; DNQ	FUJ; Ret	SUG; 13	FUJ; 21	SUZ; 13	CHA; 17	MOT; 22	MOT; 8		21st	15
2017	Porsche 911 GT3-R	Y	GT300	9	(New Zealand) Jono Lester (Japan) Kyosuke Mineo	OKA; 3	FUJ; 10	AUT; 17	SUG; 10	FUJ; 5	SUZ; 8	CHA; 14	MOT; 4		8th	53
2018	Porsche 911 GT3-R	Y	GT300	9	(Japan) Rintaro Kubo (Japan) Keishi Ishikawa (Japan) Kyosuke Mineo (5)	OKA; 16	FUJ; 17	AUT; 15	SUG; 16	FUJ; 15	SUZ; 6	CHA; 11	MOT; 12		16th	25
2019	Porsche 911 GT3-R	Y	GT300	9	(Japan) Naoki Yokomizo (Japan) Kyosuke Mineo (Japan) Akihiro Tsuzuki (5)	OKA; 15	FUJ; 22	SUZ; 22	CHA; 16	FUJ; 19	AUT; 22	SUG; 9	MOT; 15		20th	20
2020	Aston Martin Vantage AMR GT3	M	GT300	9	(Japan) Tomonobu Fujii (Japan) Kei Cozzolino (1–4, 6–7) (Japan) Takuro Shinohara (5, 8)	FUJ; 10	FUJ; 19	SUZ; 10	MOT; 18	FUJ; 24	SUZ; 24	MOT; 25	FUJ; 5		19th	30
2021	Ferrari 488 GT3 Evo 2020	Y	GT300	9	(Japan) Kei Cozzolino (Japan) Takeshi Kimura (1–2, 5–6, 8) (Japan) Naoki Yokomizo (3–4, 7)	OKA; 23	FUJ; 25	SUZ; 4	TRM; 7	SUG; 15	AUT; 9	MOT; 19	FUJ; 13		16th	35
2022	Ferrari 488 GT3 Evo 2020	Y	GT300	9	(Japan) Kei Cozzolino (Japan) Naoki Yokomizo (1, 5) (Japan) Takeshi Kimura (2–4, 6–8) (Japan) Shintaro Kawabata (4)	OKA; 4	FUJ; 23	SUZ; 17	FUJ; 12	SUZ; 11	SUG; Ret	AUT; 13	MOT; 15		19th	26.5
2023	Mercedes-AMG GT3 Evo	Y	GT300	9	(Japan) Ryohei Sakaguchi (China) Liang Jiatong (Japan) Shintaro Kawabata (2–5, 7)	OKA; 23	FUJ	SUZ; 24	FUJ; 22	SUZ; 11	SUG; 17	AUT; 23	MOT; 19		24th	14
2024	Mercedes-AMG GT3 Evo	Y	GT300	9	(Japan) Ryohei Sakaguchi (Japan) Yusuke Tomibayashi (Japan) Yuta Fujiwara (2–4, 6, 8)	OKA; 21	FUJ; 12	SUZ; 17	FUJ; Ret	SUG; 14	AUT; 20	MOT; Ret	SUZ; 17		23rd	12
2025	Mercedes-AMG GT3 Evo	Y	GT300	9	(Japan) Yusuke Tomibayashi (1–2, 4–8) (Japan) Ryohei Sakaguchi (1–2, 4–7) (Japan) Yuta Fujiwara (2, 7–8)	OKA; 5	FUJ; 18	SEP	FUJ; SPR1; 22	FUJ; SPR2; 13	SUZ; 21	SUG; 16	AUT; 23	MOT; 17	21st	28.5
2026	BMW M4 GT3 Evo	Y	GT300	9	(Japan) Yusuke Tomibayashi (Japan) Yuta Fujiwara (Japan) Rintaro Kubo	OKA	FUJ	SEP	FUJ	SUZ	SUG	AUT	MOT		TBD	TBD

== See also ==
- Goodsmile Racing, another Super GT team with itasha race cars
