= Yusuke Tomibayashi =

Japanese racing driver (born 1996)

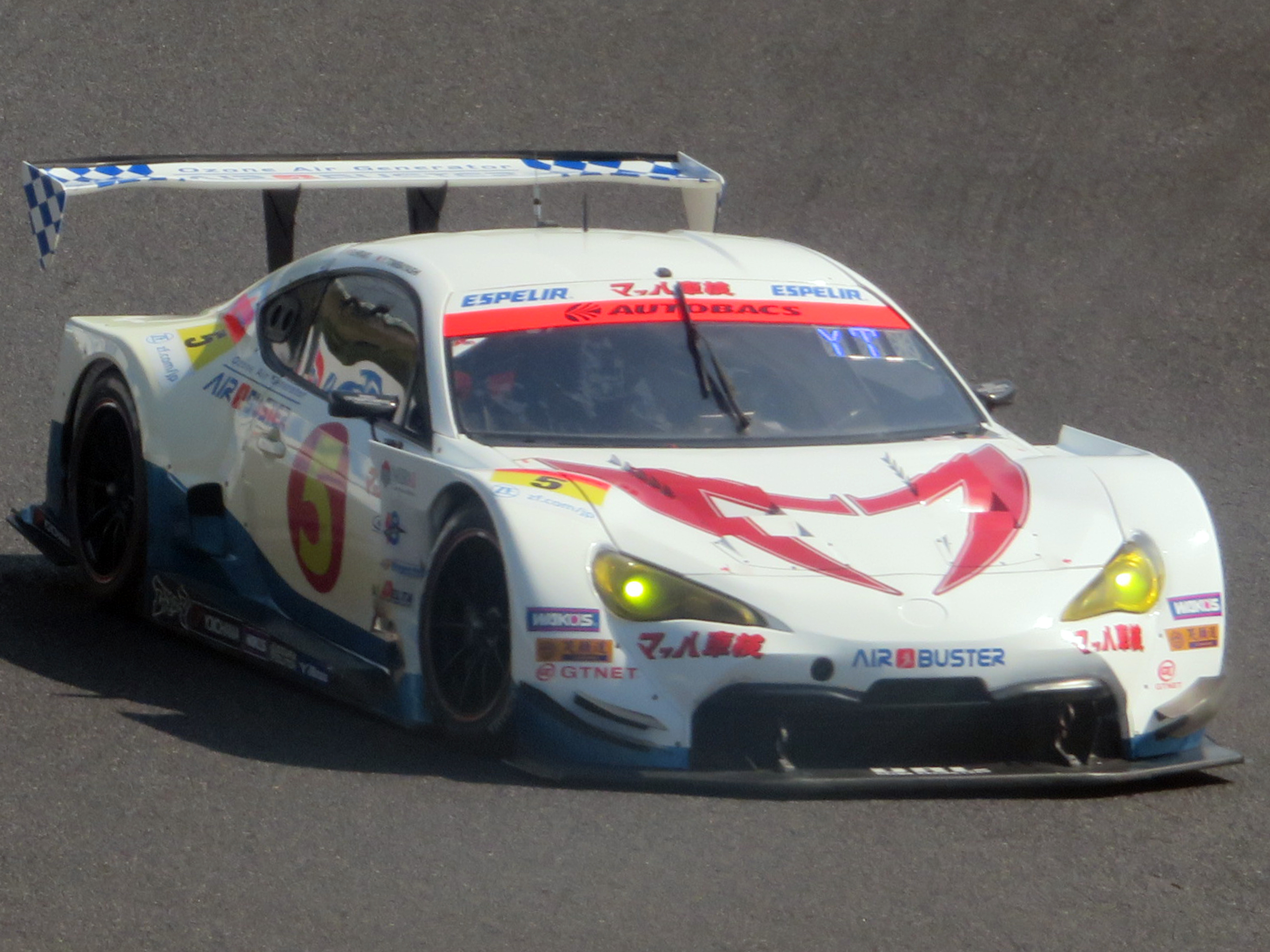
- Tomibayashi in 2022
- Nationality: (Japan) Japanese
- Born: 4 May 1996 (age 30) Yokohama, Japan

Super GT – GT300 career
- Debut season: 2022
- Current team: Pacific Racing Team
- Car number: 9
- Former teams: Team Mach
- Starts: 39
- Wins: 1
- Podiums: 2
- Poles: 1
- Fastest laps: 1
- Best finish: 18th in 2022

Championship titles
- 2023 2022 2020–2022 2019: Super Taikyu – ST-4; TGR GR86/BRZ Cup; Super Taikyu – ST-3; Roadster Party Race East Japan Series – ND Series

Yusuke Tomibayashi (冨林 勇佑, Tomibayashi Yūsuke; born 4 May 1996 in Yokohama) is a Japanese racing driver and sim racer who last competed for Pacific Racing Team in the GT300 class of Super GT. He is the 2022 Toyota Gazoo Racing GR86/BRZ Cup champion.

== Esports career ==
Starting his career on racing simulators, Tomibayashi saw early success on Gran Turismo Sport-based championships, winning the FIA-sanctioned 2016 Manufacturer Fan Cup and taking fifth in the 2018 Roots Japan Cup Final.

In 2019, Tomibayashi won the Roots Japan Cup Final and the National Prefectural eSports Championship at Ibaraki, representing Kanagawa. Three years later, in 2022, he participated in the iRacing-based Suzuka E-Sports Challenge Race along with Iori Kimura.

== Super Taikyu ==
After winning the 2019 Roadster Party Race East Japan Series and making his Super Taikyu debut the same year, Tomibayashi began racing in Super Taikyu full time the following year, competing in the ST-3 class for Tracy Sports with Delta. In his first full season in the series, Tomibayashi scored two wins and took three further podiums to secure his first series title. Remaining with the team for the following season, Tomibayashi won at Autopolis and Suzuka to clinch his second ST-3 title with a race to spare.

Tracy Sports with Delta retained Tomibayashi for the 2022 season, staying in ST-3 class alongside the returning Hirotaka Ishii, and Takashi Ito who moved over from the 41 car. Tomibayashi won at Sugo and clinched his third ST-3 title in a row. Staying with Tracy Sports with Delta for the fourth season in a row, Tomibayashi moved to the ST-4 class for the 2023 season. Tomibayashi took wins at Motegi and Okayama to win his fourth straight Super Taikyu title and first in ST-4.

Tomibayashi stayed in the ST-4 class for the 2024 season, continuing a five year-long partnership with Tracy Sports with Delta. In the final race of the season, Tomibayashi was leading in his class but suffered a tire failure in the closing stages, which forced the car into retirement and had to settle for third in the standings. Remaining with the team and class for 2025, Tomibayashi finished on the podium in all but two races he started to help the team secure third in the class standings. In 2026, Tomibayashi continued with Tracy Sports to remain in the ST-4 class of Super Taikyu.

== Super GT ==
Tomibayashi stepped up to Super GT's GT300 class in 2022, joining Team Mach alongside Reiji Hiraki, becoming Japan's first sim-racer to race in the series. In only his third race in GT300, Tomibayashi finished on the podium, taking second place at Suzuka. Towards the end of 2022, it was announced that Tomibayashi would return to Team Mach for the 2023 season, alongside Takamitsu Matsui. In the opening race of the season at Okayama, Tomibayashi scored 15th place in a weekend headlined by rain.

After two years at Team Mach, Tomibayashi joined Pacific Racing Team ahead of the 2024 season alongside Ryohei Sakaguchi. In the second round at Fuji, Tomibayashi ended the race in 12th, which would turn out to be his season-best result. Tomibayashi returned to Pacific Racing Team for the 2025 season, alongside Sakaguchi and returning third driver Yuta Fujiwara. Competing in all but one rounds, Tomibayashi scored a best result of fifth at Okayama and scored further points in the Fuji Sprint to end the year 26th in points. The following year, Tomibayashi continued with Pacific Racing Team as they began fielding a BMW M4 GT3 Evo, achieving his maiden series win at Suzuka from pole, crediting Gran Turismo 7's renewed driving physics as a contributor for his first GT300 win.

== Racing record ==
=== Racing career summary ===
Season	Series	Team	Races	Wins	Poles	F/Laps	Podiums	Points	Position
2019	Roadster Party Race East Japan Series – ND Series	Ena Motorsports Club	5	3	0	0	3	79	1st
2019	Super Taikyu – ST-4	Glory Racing with A-One	1	0	0	0	0	9‡	11th‡
2020	Super Taikyu – ST-3	Tracy Sports with Delta	5	2	1	0	5	117.5‡	1st‡
2020	Mini Challenge Japan – Cooper S	D.D.R	2	2	1	2	2	148	10th
2021	Super Taikyu – ST-3	Tracy Sports with Delta	6	2	3	1	5	119.5‡	1st‡
2022	Super GT – GT300	Team Mach	8	0	0	0	1	15	18th
2022	Super Taikyu – ST-3	Tracy Sports with Delta	6	1	1	1	6	136.5‡	1st‡
2022	TGR GR86/BRZ Cup	Delta Motorsports	6	0	0	0	3	58	1st
2023	Super GT – GT300	Team Mach	8	0	0	0	0	0	NC
2023	Super Taikyu – ST-3	Tracy Sports with Delta	1	0	0	0	0	134.5‡	2nd‡
2023	Super Taikyu – ST-4	Tracy Sports with Delta	6	2	1	0	5	132‡	1st‡
2023	TGR GR86/BRZ Cup	Delta Motorsports	7	0	0	0	0	19	13th
2024	Super GT – GT300	Pacific Racing Team	8	0	0	0	0	0	NC
2024	Super Taikyu – ST-3	Tracy Sports with Delta	1	1	0	0	1	129‡	2nd‡
2024	Super Taikyu – ST-4	Tracy Sports with Delta	6	1	3	0	4	116.5‡	3rd‡
2024	TGR GR86/BRZ Cup	Delta Motorsports	8	0	1	0	3	56	3rd
2025	Super GT – GT300	Pacific Racing Team	7	0	0	0	0	12.5	26th
2025	Super Taikyu – ST-4	Tracy Sports with Delta	6	0	0	0	4	111.5‡	3rd‡
2025	TGR GR86/BRZ Cup	Delta Motorsports	7	1	1	0	1	29	7th
2026	Super GT – GT300	Pacific Racing Team	8	1	1	1	1	35	20th
2026	Super Taikyu – ST-4	Tracy Sports						‡	‡
2026	TGR GR86/BRZ Cup	K-one Racing Team						*	*

‡ Team standings

=== Complete Super GT results ===
Year	Team	Car	Class	1	2	3	4	5	6	7	8	9	DC	Points
2022	Team Mach	Toyota 86 MC GT300	GT300	OKA; 18	FUJ; 24	SUZ; 2	FUJ; 17	SUZ; 19	SUG; 21	AUT; 25	MOT; Ret		18th	15
2023	Team Mach	Toyota 86 MC GT300	GT300	OKA; 15	FUJ1; 22	SUZ1; 19	FUJ2; 18	SUZ2; 21	SUG; 22	AUT; 18	MOT; 18		NC	0
2024	Pacific Racing Team	Mercedes-AMG GT3 Evo	GT300	OKA; 21	FUJ; 12	SUZ; 17	FUJ; Ret	SUZ; 14	SUG; 20	AUT; Ret	MOT; 17		NC	0
2025	Pacific Racing Team	Mercedes-AMG GT3 Evo	GT300	OKA; 5	FUJ; 18	SEP	FS1 (22)	FS2; 13	SUZ; 21	SUG; 16	AUT; 23	MOT; 17	26th	12.5
2026	Pacific Racing Team	BMW M4 GT3 Evo	GT300	OKA; 23	FUJ; 22	FUJ; 16	SUZ; 1	SUG; 12	AUT; 21	MOT; 11	MOT; Ret		20th	35

^{‡} Half points awarded as less than 75% of race distance was completed.
^{(Number)} Driver did not take part in this sprint race, points are still awarded for the teammate's result.
^{*} Season still in progress.
