= 2014 Super GT Series =

Motorsport season

The 2014 Autobacs Super GT Series was the twenty-second season of the Japan Automobile Federation Super GT Championship including the All Japan Grand Touring Car Championship (JGTC) era, and the tenth season under the name Super GT. It marked the thirty-second season overall of a Japanese professional sportscar championship dating back to the All Japan Sports Prototype Championship. It was the first year of new GT500 regulations as the 2014 season saw unified technical regulations with the Deutsche Tourenwagen Masters. The season began on April 6 and ended on November 16, after 8 races.

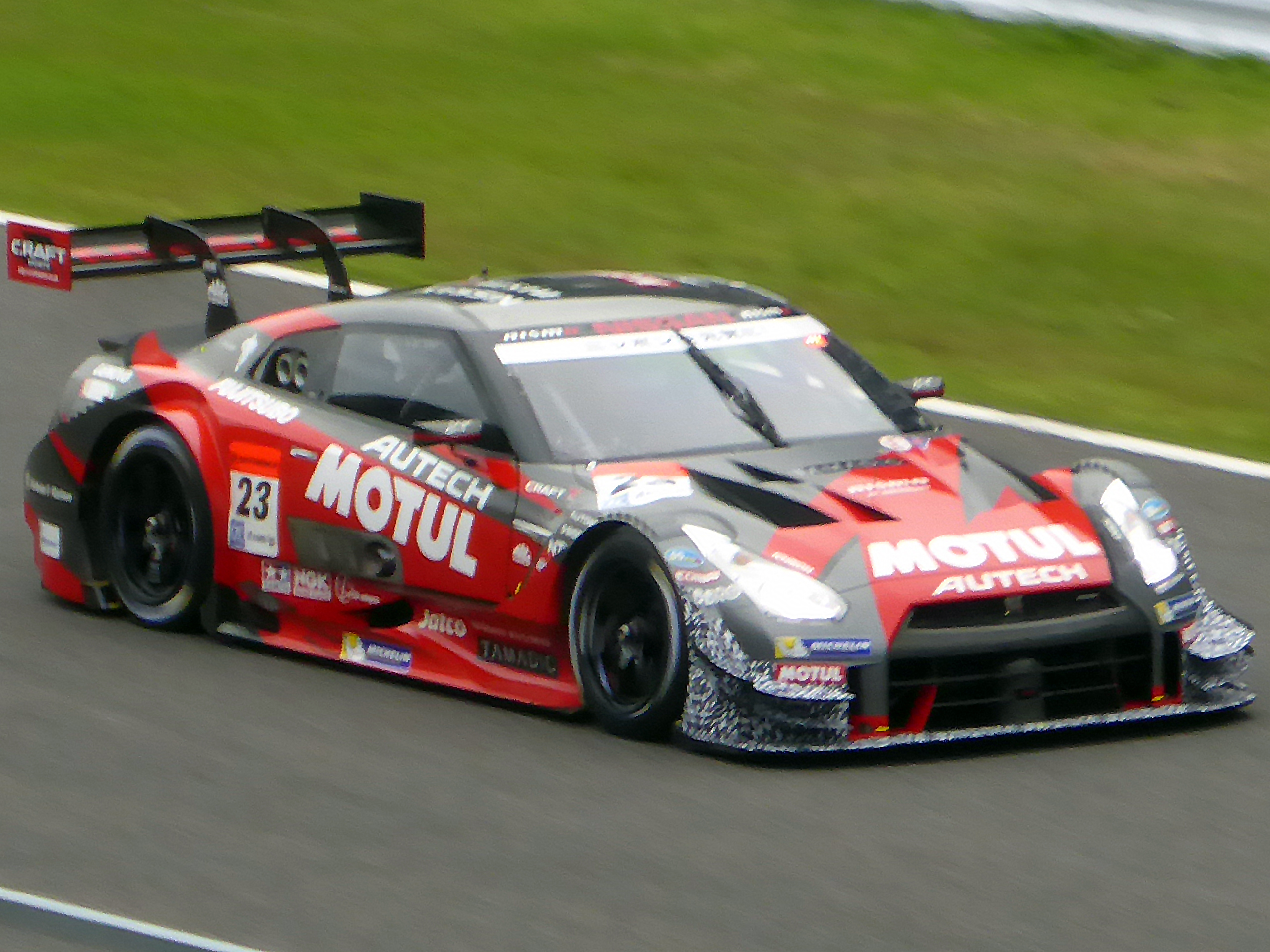
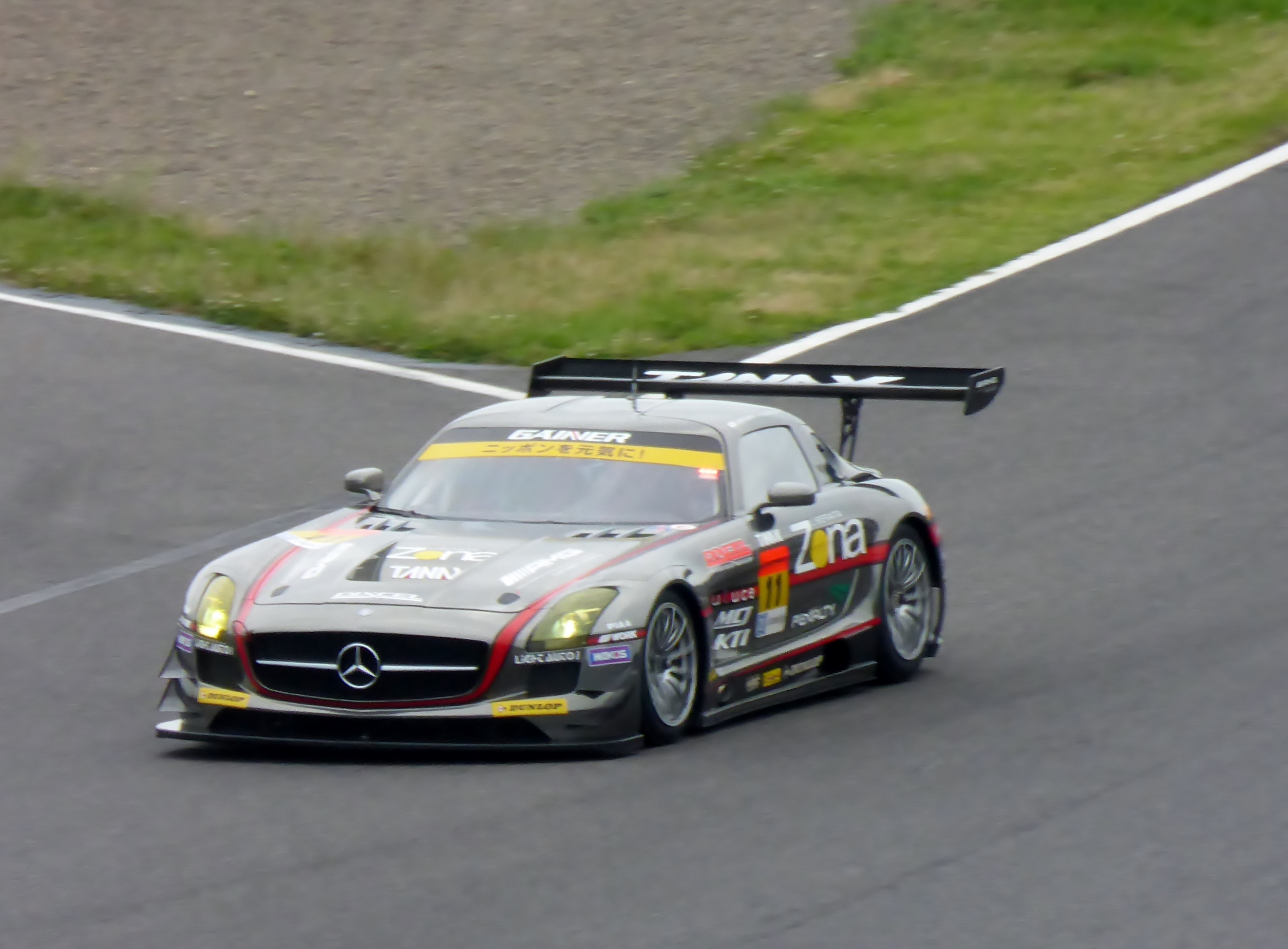
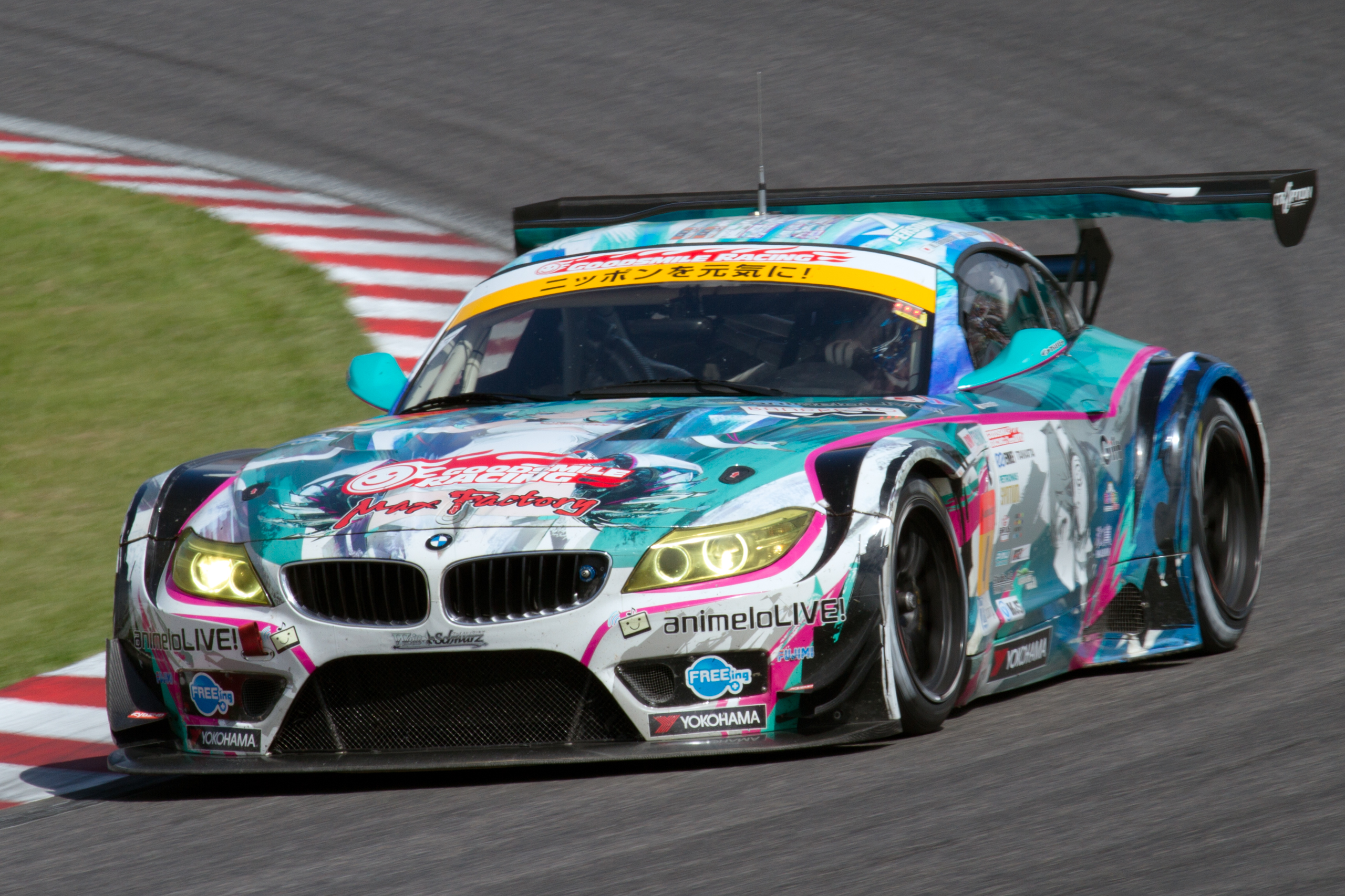
The No. 23 Nismo car won the GT500 Drivers' and Teams' Championship title. The No. 11 Gainer car won the GT300 Teams' championship title. The No. 4 Goodsmile Racing car won the GT300 Drivers' championship title.

== Schedule ==
A provisional calendar was released on August 12, 2013.

Round	Race	Circuit	Date
1	Okayama GT; 300 km	(Japan) Okayama International Circuit	April 6
2	Fuji GT 1; 500 km	(Japan) Fuji Speedway	May 4
3	Autopolis GT; 300 km	(Japan) Autopolis	June 1
4	Sugo GT; 300 km	(Japan) Sportsland SUGO	July 20
5	Fuji GT 2; 300 km	(Japan) Fuji Speedway	August 10
6	43rd International Suzuka 1000km 1000 km	(Japan) Suzuka Circuit	August 31
7	Buriram United Super GT Race; 300 km	(Thailand) Chang International Circuit	October 5
8	Motegi GT; 250 km	(Japan) Twin Ring Motegi	November 16

2014 Japanese venues	2014 International venue

=== Calendar changes ===
- The Autopolis race was moved from its October date to the June date previously held by the Super Formula championship.
- After being on the calendar since 2000, the race at the Sepang International Circuit will not be held in 2014.
- After being on the provisional calendar as a non-championship round for 2013, the championship was scheduled to race in South Korea for the first time, at a yet to be determined venue. However, on December 16, 2013, the race was again cancelled.
- The championship will also host its first race in Thailand, at the newly built Buriram United International Circuit.
- The non-championship races at the JAF Grand Prix, was dropped for the 2014 season, the JAF Grand Prix later becoming the final round of the 2014 Super Formula season instead.

== Drivers and teams ==
=== GT500 ===
Team	Make	Car	Engine	No.	Drivers	Tyre	Rounds
(Japan) Lexus Team ZENT Cerumo	Lexus	Lexus RC F GT500	Lexus RI4AG 2.0 L Turbo I4	1	(Japan) Kohei Hirate	B	All
(Japan) Lexus Team ZENT Cerumo	Lexus	Lexus RC F GT500	Lexus RI4AG 2.0 L Turbo I4	1	(Japan) Yuji Tachikawa	B	All
(Japan) Lexus Team LeMans ENEOS	Lexus	Lexus RC F GT500	Lexus RI4AG 2.0 L Turbo I4	6	(Japan) Yuji Kunimoto	B	All
(Japan) Lexus Team LeMans ENEOS	Lexus	Lexus RC F GT500	Lexus RI4AG 2.0 L Turbo I4	6	(Japan) Kazuya Oshima	B	All
(Japan) Autobacs Racing Team Aguri	Honda	Honda NSX Concept-GT	Honda HR-414E 2.0 L Turbo I4	8	(Italy) Vitantonio Liuzzi	B	All
(Japan) Autobacs Racing Team Aguri	Honda	Honda NSX Concept-GT	Honda HR-414E 2.0 L Turbo I4	8	(Japan) Kosuke Matsuura	B	All
(Japan) Team Impul	Nissan	Nissan GT-R NISMO GT500	Nissan NR20A 2.0 L Turbo I4	12	(Brazil) João Paulo de Oliveira	B	All
(Japan) Team Impul	Nissan	Nissan GT-R NISMO GT500	Nissan NR20A 2.0 L Turbo I4	12	(Japan) Hironobu Yasuda	B	All
(Japan) Keihin Real Racing	Honda	Honda NSX Concept-GT	Honda HR-414E 2.0 L Turbo I4	17	(Japan) Toshihiro Kaneishi	B	All
(Japan) Keihin Real Racing	Honda	Honda NSX Concept-GT	Honda HR-414E 2.0 L Turbo I4	17	(Japan) Koudai Tsukakoshi	B	All
(Japan) Weider Modulo Dome Racing	Honda	Honda NSX Concept-GT	Honda HR-414E 2.0 L Turbo I4	18	(Japan) Naoki Yamamoto	M	All
(Japan) Weider Modulo Dome Racing	Honda	Honda NSX Concept-GT	Honda HR-414E 2.0 L Turbo I4	18	(France) Jean-Karl Vernay	M	1–3
(Japan) Weider Modulo Dome Racing	Honda	Honda NSX Concept-GT	Honda HR-414E 2.0 L Turbo I4	18	(France) Frédéric Makowiecki	M	4–7
(Japan) Weider Modulo Dome Racing	Honda	Honda NSX Concept-GT	Honda HR-414E 2.0 L Turbo I4	18	(Japan) Takuya Izawa	M	8
(Japan) Lexus Team WedsSport BANDOH	Lexus	Lexus RC F GT500	Lexus RI4AG 2.0 L Turbo I4	19	(Japan) Yuhi Sekiguchi	Y	All
(Japan) Lexus Team WedsSport BANDOH	Lexus	Lexus RC F GT500	Lexus RI4AG 2.0 L Turbo I4	19	(Japan) Juichi Wakisaka	Y	All
(Japan) Nismo	Nissan	Nissan GT-R NISMO GT500	Nissan NR20A 2.0 L Turbo I4	23	(Japan) Tsugio Matsuda	M	All
(Japan) Nismo	Nissan	Nissan GT-R NISMO GT500	Nissan NR20A 2.0 L Turbo I4	23	(Italy) Ronnie Quintarelli	M	All
(Japan) Kondo Racing	Nissan	Nissan GT-R NISMO GT500	Nissan NR20A 2.0 L Turbo I4	24	(Germany) Michael Krumm	Y	All
(Japan) Kondo Racing	Nissan	Nissan GT-R NISMO GT500	Nissan NR20A 2.0 L Turbo I4	24	(Japan) Daiki Sasaki	Y	All
(Japan) Nakajima Racing	Honda	Honda NSX Concept-GT	Honda HR-414E 2.0 L Turbo I4	32	(Belgium) Bertrand Baguette	D	All
(Japan) Nakajima Racing	Honda	Honda NSX Concept-GT	Honda HR-414E 2.0 L Turbo I4	32	(Japan) Daisuke Nakajima	D	All
(Japan) Lexus Team Petronas TOM'S	Lexus	Lexus RC F GT500	Lexus RI4AG 2.0 L Turbo I4	36	(United Kingdom) James Rossiter	B	All
(Japan) Lexus Team Petronas TOM'S	Lexus	Lexus RC F GT500	Lexus RI4AG 2.0 L Turbo I4	36	(Japan) Kazuki Nakajima	B	1, 4–8
(Japan) Lexus Team Petronas TOM'S	Lexus	Lexus RC F GT500	Lexus RI4AG 2.0 L Turbo I4	36	(Japan) Ryo Hirakawa	B	2–3
(Japan) Lexus Team KeePer TOM'S	Lexus	Lexus RC F GT500	Lexus RI4AG 2.0 L Turbo I4	37	(Italy) Andrea Caldarelli	B	All
(Japan) Lexus Team KeePer TOM'S	Lexus	Lexus RC F GT500	Lexus RI4AG 2.0 L Turbo I4	37	(Japan) Daisuke Ito	B	All
(Japan) Lexus Team SARD	Lexus	Lexus RC F GT500	Lexus RI4AG 2.0 L Turbo I4	39	(Japan) Hiroaki Ishiura	B	All
(Japan) Lexus Team SARD	Lexus	Lexus RC F GT500	Lexus RI4AG 2.0 L Turbo I4	39	(United Kingdom) Oliver Jarvis	B	All
(Japan) MOLA	Nissan	Nissan GT-R NISMO GT500	Nissan NR20A 2.0 L Turbo I4	46	(Japan) Satoshi Motoyama	M	All
(Japan) MOLA	Nissan	Nissan GT-R NISMO GT500	Nissan NR20A 2.0 L Turbo I4	46	(Japan) Masataka Yanagida	M	All
(Japan) Team Kunimitsu	Honda	Honda NSX Concept-GT	Honda HR-414E 2.0 L Turbo I4	100	(Japan) Takashi Kogure	B	All
(Japan) Team Kunimitsu	Honda	Honda NSX Concept-GT	Honda HR-414E 2.0 L Turbo I4	100	(Japan) Hideki Mutoh	B	All

=== GT300 ===
Team	Make	Car	Engine	No.	Drivers	Tyre	Rounds
(Japan) Team Mugen	Honda	Honda CR-Z GT	Honda HR28TT 2.8 L Twin Turbo Hybrid V6	0	(Japan) Yuhki Nakayama	B	All
(Japan) Team Mugen	Honda	Honda CR-Z GT	Honda HR28TT 2.8 L Twin Turbo Hybrid V6	0	(Japan) Tomoki Nojiri	B	All
(Japan) Team Mugen	Honda	Honda CR-Z GT	Honda HR28TT 2.8 L Twin Turbo Hybrid V6	0	(Japan) Ryō Michigami	B	6
(Japan) Cars Tokai Dream28	McLaren	McLaren MP4-12C GT3	McLaren M838T 3.8 L Twin Turbo V8	2	(Japan) Hiroki Katoh	Y	All
(Japan) Cars Tokai Dream28	McLaren	McLaren MP4-12C GT3	McLaren M838T 3.8 L Twin Turbo V8	2	(Japan) Kazuho Takahashi	Y	All
(Japan) Cars Tokai Dream28	McLaren	McLaren MP4-12C GT3	McLaren M838T 3.8 L Twin Turbo V8	2	(Japan) Hiroshi Hamaguchi	Y	6
(Japan) NDDP Racing	Nissan	Nissan GT-R GT3	Nissan VR38DETT 3.8 L Twin Turbo V6	3	(Japan) Kazuki Hoshino	Y	All
(Japan) NDDP Racing	Nissan	Nissan GT-R GT3	Nissan VR38DETT 3.8 L Twin Turbo V6	3	(Spain) Lucas Ordóñez	Y	All
(Japan) NDDP Racing	Nissan	Nissan GT-R GT3	Nissan VR38DETT 3.8 L Twin Turbo V6	3	(Belgium) Wolfgang Reip	Y	6
(Japan) Goodsmile Racing & Team Ukyo	BMW	BMW Z4 GT3	BMW P65B44 4.4 L V8	4	(Japan) Tatsuya Kataoka	Y	All
(Japan) Goodsmile Racing & Team Ukyo	BMW	BMW Z4 GT3	BMW P65B44 4.4 L V8	4	(Japan) Nobuteru Taniguchi	Y	All
(Japan) Team Mach	Nissan	Nissan GT-R GT3	Nissan VR38DETT 3.8 L Twin Turbo V6	5	(Japan) Tetsuji Tamanaka	Y	1–3, 5–6
(Japan) Team Mach	Nissan	Nissan GT-R GT3	Nissan VR38DETT 3.8 L Twin Turbo V6	5	(Japan) Junichiro Yamashita	Y	1–2, 5
(Japan) Team Mach	Nissan	Nissan GT-R GT3	Nissan VR38DETT 3.8 L Twin Turbo V6	5	(Japan) Kazuya Tsuruta	Y	2, 6
(Japan) Team Mach	Nissan	Nissan GT-R GT3	Nissan VR38DETT 3.8 L Twin Turbo V6	5	(Japan) Naoya Yamano	Y	3, 6
(Japan) BMW Sports Trophy Team Studie	BMW	BMW Z4 GT3	BMW P65B44 4.4 L V8	7	(Germany) Jörg Müller	Y	All
(Japan) BMW Sports Trophy Team Studie	BMW	BMW Z4 GT3	BMW P65B44 4.4 L V8	7	(Japan) Seiji Ara	Y	All
(Japan) BMW Sports Trophy Team Studie	BMW	BMW Z4 GT3	BMW P65B44 4.4 L V8	7	(Brazil) Augusto Farfus	Y	6
(Japan) Pacific Direction Racing	Porsche	Porsche 911 GT3	Porsche M97/80 4.0 L F6	9	(Japan) Takuya Shirasaka	Y	1–6, 8
(Japan) Pacific Direction Racing	Porsche	Porsche 911 GT3	Porsche M97/80 4.0 L F6	9	(Japan) Yuya Sakamoto	Y	1–2, 8
(Japan) Pacific Direction Racing	Porsche	Porsche 911 GT3	Porsche M97/80 4.0 L F6	9	(Japan) Taiyo Iida	Y	2, 6
(Japan) Pacific Direction Racing	Porsche	Porsche 911 GT3	Porsche M97/80 4.0 L F6	9	(Macau) André Couto	Y	3–6
(Japan) Gainer	Mercedes-Benz	Mercedes-Benz SLS AMG GT3	Mercedes-Benz M159 6.2 L V8	10	(Japan) Masayuki Ueda	D	All
(Japan) Gainer	Mercedes-Benz	Mercedes-Benz SLS AMG GT3	Mercedes-Benz M159 6.2 L V8	10	(Japan) Hideki Yamauchi	D	All
(Japan) Gainer	Mercedes-Benz	Mercedes-Benz SLS AMG GT3	Mercedes-Benz M159 6.2 L V8	11	(Japan) Katsuyuki Hiranaka	D	All
(Japan) Gainer	Mercedes-Benz	Mercedes-Benz SLS AMG GT3	Mercedes-Benz M159 6.2 L V8	11	(Sweden) Björn Wirdheim	D	All
(Japan) Audi Team Hitotsuyama	Audi	Audi R8 LMS ultra	Audi CJJ 5.2 L V10	21	(Japan) Tomonobu Fujii	Y	All
(Japan) Audi Team Hitotsuyama	Audi	Audi R8 LMS ultra	Audi CJJ 5.2 L V10	21	(United Kingdom) Richard Lyons	Y	1, 3–8
(Japan) Audi Team Hitotsuyama	Audi	Audi R8 LMS ultra	Audi CJJ 5.2 L V10	21	(Netherlands) Carlo van Dam	Y	2
(Japan) Audi Team Hitotsuyama	Audi	Audi R8 LMS ultra	Audi CJJ 5.2 L V10	21	(Germany) Christopher Haase	Y	6
(Japan) R'Qs Motor Sports	Mercedes-Benz	Mercedes-Benz SLS AMG GT3	Mercedes-Benz M159 6.2 L V8	22	(Japan) Hisashi Wada	Y	All
(Japan) R'Qs Motor Sports	Mercedes-Benz	Mercedes-Benz SLS AMG GT3	Mercedes-Benz M159 6.2 L V8	22	(Japan) Takeshi Tsuchiya	Y	1–3
(Japan) R'Qs Motor Sports	Mercedes-Benz	Mercedes-Benz SLS AMG GT3	Mercedes-Benz M159 6.2 L V8	22	(Japan) Tetsuya Tanaka	Y	4
(Japan) R'Qs Motor Sports	Mercedes-Benz	Mercedes-Benz SLS AMG GT3	Mercedes-Benz M159 6.2 L V8	22	(Japan) Masaki Jyonai	Y	5–8
(Japan) apr	Nissan	Nissan GT-R GT3	Nissan VR38DETT 3.8 L Twin Turbo V6	30	(Japan) Yuki Iwasaki	Y	All
(Japan) apr	Nissan	Nissan GT-R GT3	Nissan VR38DETT 3.8 L Twin Turbo V6	30	(Japan) Masami Kageyama	Y	All
(Japan) apr	Nissan	Nissan GT-R GT3	Nissan VR38DETT 3.8 L Twin Turbo V6	30	(Japan) Tohjiro Azuma	Y	6
(Japan) apr	Toyota	Toyota Prius apr GT	Toyota RV8KLM 3.4 L Hybrid V8	31	(Japan) Morio Nitta	Y	All
(Japan) apr	Toyota	Toyota Prius apr GT	Toyota RV8KLM 3.4 L Hybrid V8	31	(Japan) Koki Saga	Y	All
(Japan) apr	Toyota	Toyota Prius apr GT	Toyota RV8KLM 3.4 L Hybrid V8	31	(Japan) Yuichi Nakayama	Y	6
(Japan) Porsche Team KTR	Porsche	Porsche 911 GT3	Porsche M97/80 4.0 L F6	33	(Japan) Akihiro Tsuzuki	Y	All
(Japan) Porsche Team KTR	Porsche	Porsche 911 GT3	Porsche M97/80 4.0 L F6	33	(Germany) Tim Bergmeister	Y	1–2, 6
(Japan) Porsche Team KTR	Porsche	Porsche 911 GT3	Porsche M97/80 4.0 L F6	33	(Japan) Kyosuke Mineo	Y	3, 5, 7–8
(Japan) Porsche Team KTR	Porsche	Porsche 911 GT3	Porsche M97/80 4.0 L F6	33	(Germany) Jörg Bergmeister	Y	4, 6
(Japan) Dijon Racing	Nissan	Nissan GT-R GT3	Nissan VR38DETT 3.8 L Twin Turbo V6	48	(Japan) Hiroshi Takamori	Y	1–6, 8
(Japan) Dijon Racing	Nissan	Nissan GT-R GT3	Nissan VR38DETT 3.8 L Twin Turbo V6	48	(Japan) Masaki Tanaka	Y	1–6, 8
(Japan) Dijon Racing	Nissan	Nissan GT-R GT3	Nissan VR38DETT 3.8 L Twin Turbo V6	48	(Japan) Keiichi Inoue	Y	2, 7
(Japan) Dijon Racing	Nissan	Nissan GT-R GT3	Nissan VR38DETT 3.8 L Twin Turbo V6	48	(Japan) Ryuichiro Tomita	Y	6, 7
(Japan) Arnage Racing	Aston Martin	Aston Martin V12 Vantage GT3	Aston Martin AM11 5.9 L V12	50	(Japan) Masaki Kano	Y	All
(Japan) Arnage Racing	Aston Martin	Aston Martin V12 Vantage GT3	Aston Martin AM11 5.9 L V12	50	(Japan) Hideto Yasuoka	Y	1–6, 8
(Japan) Arnage Racing	Aston Martin	Aston Martin V12 Vantage GT3	Aston Martin AM11 5.9 L V12	50	(Thailand) Nanin Indra-Payoong	Y	2, 6–7
(Japan) Autobacs Racing Team Aguri	Honda	Honda CR-Z GT	Honda HR28TT 2.8 L Twin Turbo Hybrid V6	55	(Japan) Shinichi Takagi	B	All
(Japan) Autobacs Racing Team Aguri	Honda	Honda CR-Z GT	Honda HR28TT 2.8 L Twin Turbo Hybrid V6	55	(Japan) Takashi Kobayashi	B	All
(Japan) LM corsa	BMW	BMW Z4 GT3	BMW P65B44 4.4 L V8	60	(Japan) Hiroki Yoshimoto	Y	All
(Japan) LM corsa	BMW	BMW Z4 GT3	BMW P65B44 4.4 L V8	60	(Japan) Akira Iida	Y	1–7
(Japan) LM corsa	BMW	BMW Z4 GT3	BMW P65B44 4.4 L V8	60	(Japan) Shinya Sato	Y	6, 8
(Japan) R&D Sport	Subaru	Subaru BRZ	Subaru EJ20 2.0 L Turbo F4	61	(Japan) Takuto Iguchi	M	All
(Japan) R&D Sport	Subaru	Subaru BRZ	Subaru EJ20 2.0 L Turbo F4	61	(Japan) Kota Sasaki	M	All
(Japan) Leon Racing	Mercedes-Benz	Mercedes-Benz SLS AMG GT3	Mercedes-Benz M159 6.2 L V8	65	(Japan) Haruki Kurosawa	Y	All
(Japan) Leon Racing	Mercedes-Benz	Mercedes-Benz SLS AMG GT3	Mercedes-Benz M159 6.2 L V8	65	(Japan) Kyosuke Mineo	Y	1–2
(Japan) Leon Racing	Mercedes-Benz	Mercedes-Benz SLS AMG GT3	Mercedes-Benz M159 6.2 L V8	65	(Japan) Tsubasa Kurosawa	Y	2–7
(Japan) Leon Racing	Mercedes-Benz	Mercedes-Benz SLS AMG GT3	Mercedes-Benz M159 6.2 L V8	65	(Japan) Naoya Gamou	Y	8
(Japan) Team Taisan	Nissan	Nissan GT-R GT3	Nissan VR38DETT 3.8 L Twin Turbo V6	67	(Japan) Shogo Mitsuyama	Y	1–6, 8
(Japan) Team Taisan	Nissan	Nissan GT-R GT3	Nissan VR38DETT 3.8 L Twin Turbo V6	67	(Japan) Naoki Yokomizo	Y	1–6, 8
(Japan) Team Taisan	Nissan	Nissan GT-R GT3	Nissan VR38DETT 3.8 L Twin Turbo V6	67	(Japan) Kyosuke Mineo	Y	6
(Japan) JLOC	Lamborghini	Lamborghini Gallardo GT3	Lamborghini CEH 5.2 L V10	86	(Japan) Shinya Hosokawa	Y	All
(Japan) JLOC	Lamborghini	Lamborghini Gallardo GT3	Lamborghini CEH 5.2 L V10	86	(Japan) Koji Yamanishi	Y	All
(Japan) JLOC	Lamborghini	Lamborghini Gallardo GT3	Lamborghini CEH 5.2 L V10	88	(Japan) Takayuki Aoki	Y	All
(Japan) JLOC	Lamborghini	Lamborghini Gallardo GT3	Lamborghini CEH 5.2 L V10	88	(Japan) Manabu Orido	Y	All
(Japan) JLOC	Lamborghini	Lamborghini Gallardo GT3	Lamborghini CEH 5.2 L V10	88	(Japan) Kazuki Hiramine	Y	6
(Japan) i-mobile-AAS	Porsche	Porsche 911 GT3	Porsche M97/80 4.0 L F6	99	(Switzerland) Alexandre Imperatori	M	7
(Japan) i-mobile-AAS	Porsche	Porsche 911 GT3	Porsche M97/80 4.0 L F6	99	(Thailand) Vutthikorn Inthraphuvasak	M	7
Toyota Team Thailand	Toyota	Toyota 86 MC GT300	GTA V8 4.5 L V8	194	(Thailand) Nattavude Charoensukhawatana	Y	7
Toyota Team Thailand	Toyota	Toyota 86 MC GT300	GTA V8 4.5 L V8	194	(Japan) Takeshi Tsuchiya	Y	7
(Japan) Tomei Sports	Nissan	Nissan GT-R GT3	Nissan VR38DETT 3.8 L Twin Turbo V6	360	(Japan) Atsushi Tanaka	Y	1–3, 5–6, 8
(Japan) Tomei Sports	Nissan	Nissan GT-R GT3	Nissan VR38DETT 3.8 L Twin Turbo V6	360	(Japan) Hiroki Yoshida	Y	1–2, 4–6, 8
(Japan) Tomei Sports	Nissan	Nissan GT-R GT3	Nissan VR38DETT 3.8 L Twin Turbo V6	360	(Japan) Ryuju Fujita	Y	2–4, 6

== Rule changes ==
=== GT500 ===
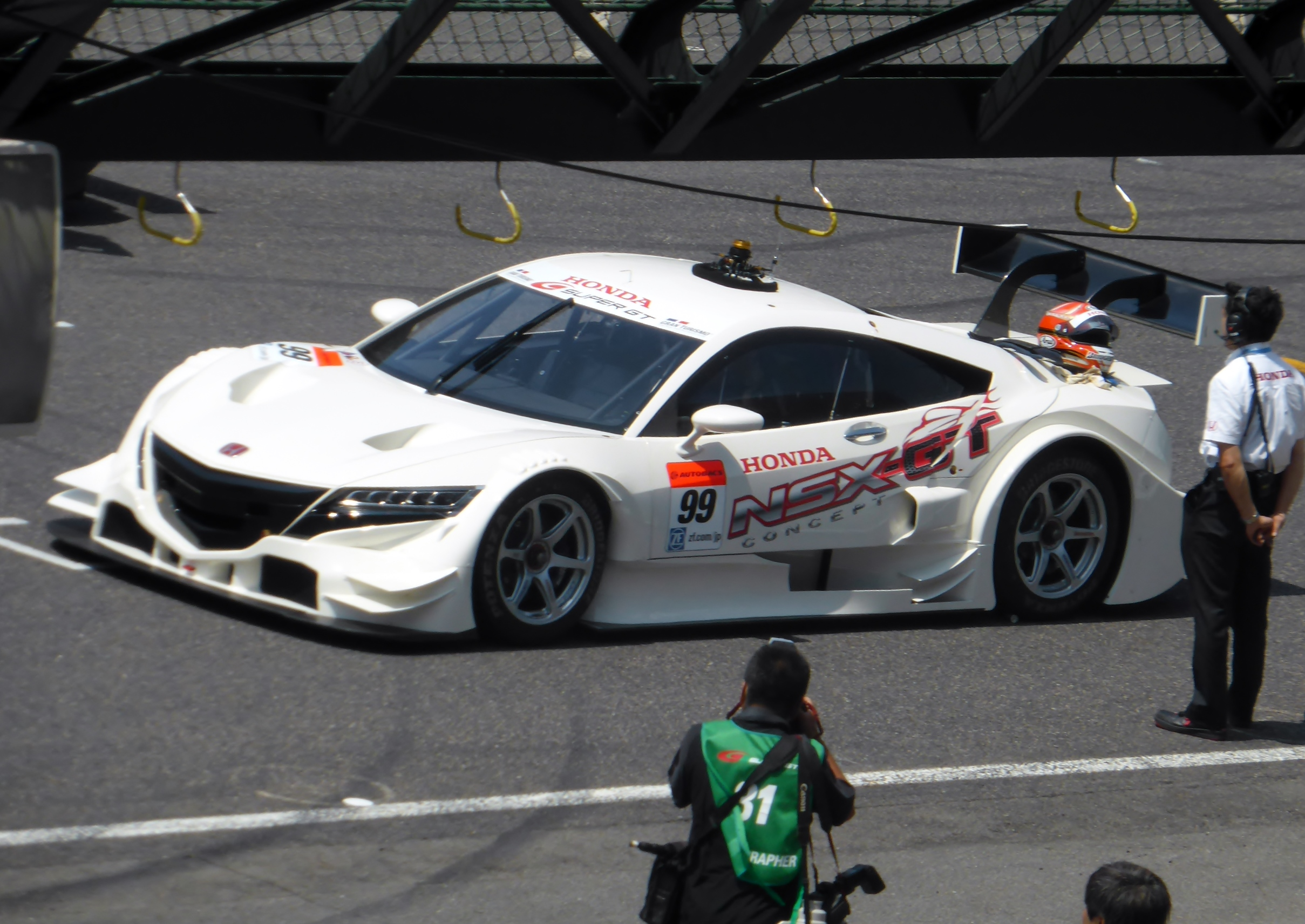
The Honda NSX-GT at its first public presentation at the 2013 42nd International Pokka Sapporo 1000km.

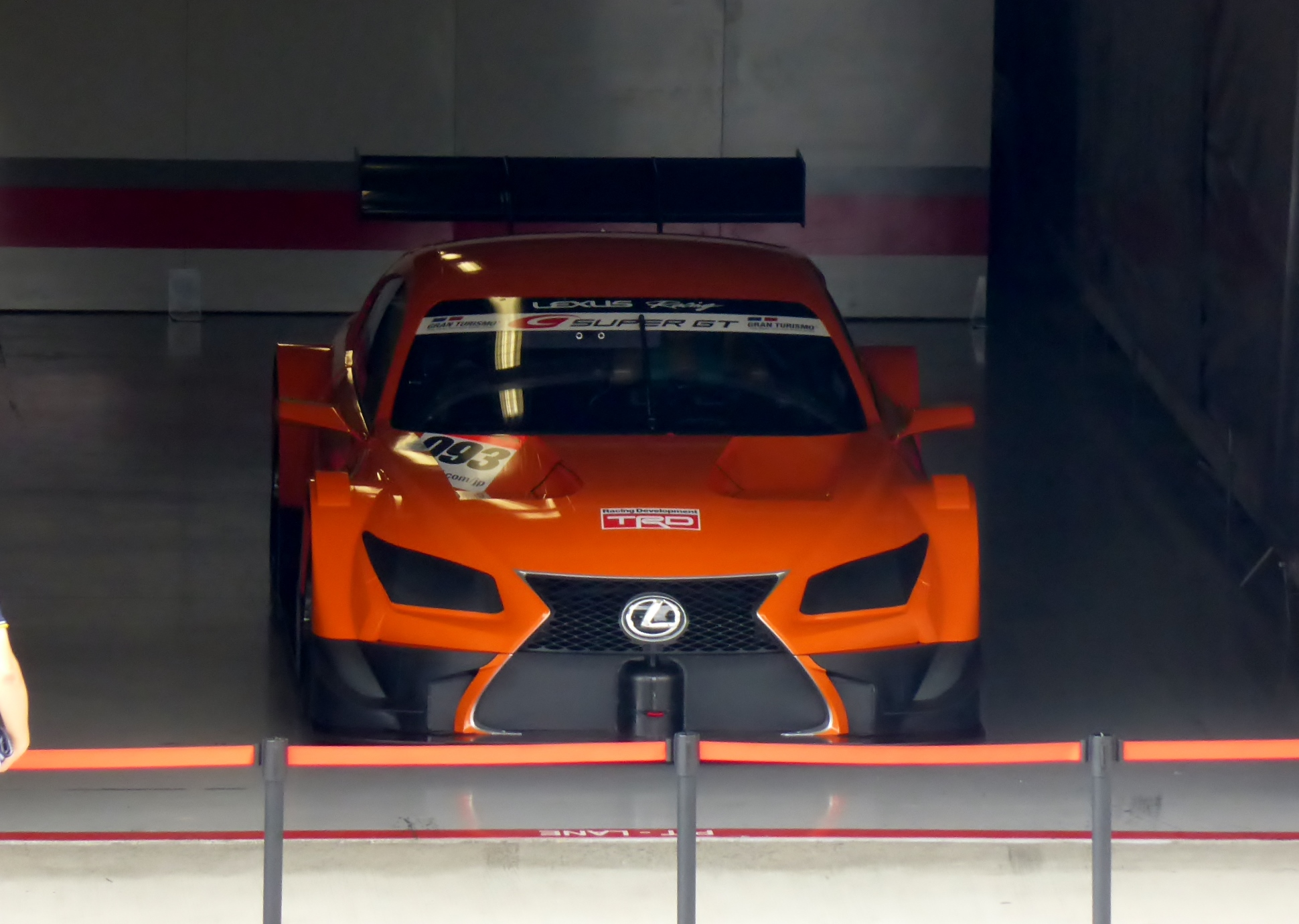
The Lexus LF-CC at its first public presentation at the 2013 42nd International Pokka Sapporo 1000km.

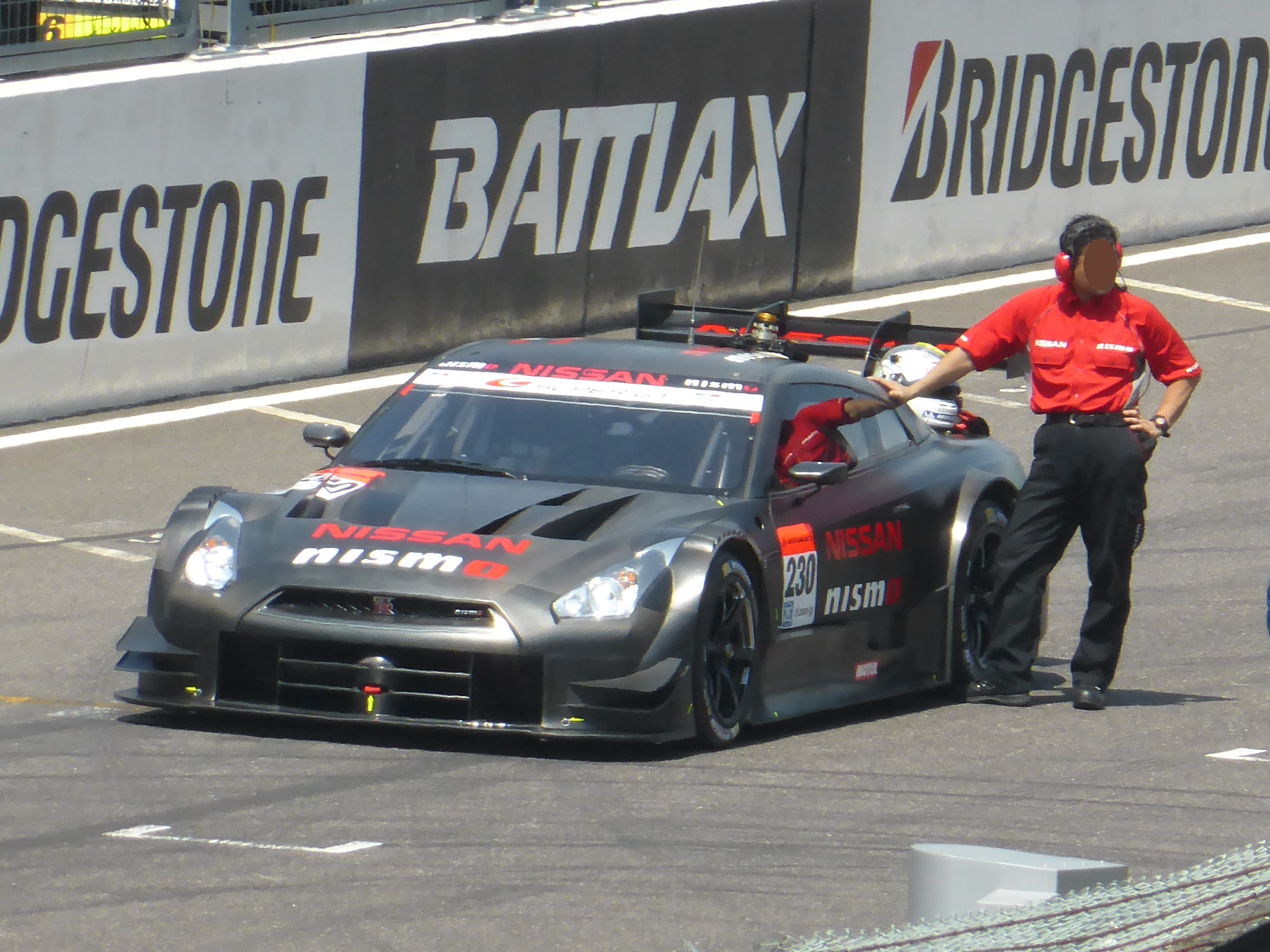
The Nissan GT-R at its first public presentation at the 2013 42nd International Pokka Sapporo 1000km.

It was announced on October 16, 2012 that the Super GT championship and the Deutsche Tourenwagen Masters will unify technical regulations for the 2014 season. The previous GT500 engines of 3.4L V8 in capacity were replaced with 2.0L Turbocharged Inline-four engines. With the new rule changes, all 3 manufacturers ran the 2014 season with new cars, the Honda HSV-010 GT and the Lexus SC430 being replaced by the new mid-engined Honda NSX-GT and the Lexus RC F respectively while Nissan continued to use the GT-R for 2014, but with a new car built for the new regulations. All 3 cars were unveiled at the 2013 42nd International Pokka Sapporo 1000km.

== Calendar ==
Round	Circuit	Date	Pole position	Race winner
1	(Japan) Okayama International Circuit; Report	6 April	#6 Lexus Team LeMans ENEOS	#37 Lexus Team KeePer TOM'S
1	(Japan) Okayama International Circuit; Report	6 April	(Japan) Yuji Kunimoto (Japan) Kazuya Oshima	(Italy) Andrea Caldarelli (Japan) Daisuke Ito
1	(Japan) Okayama International Circuit; Report	6 April	#31 apr	#4 Goodsmile Racing & Team Ukyo
1	(Japan) Okayama International Circuit; Report	6 April	(Japan) Morio Nitta (Japan) Koki Saga	(Japan) Tatsuya Kataoka (Japan) Nobuteru Taniguchi
2	(Japan) Fuji Speedway; Report	4 May	#12 Team Impul	#12 Team Impul
2	(Japan) Fuji Speedway; Report	4 May	(Brazil) João Paulo de Oliveira (Japan) Hironobu Yasuda	(Brazil) João Paulo de Oliveira (Japan) Hironobu Yasuda
2	(Japan) Fuji Speedway; Report	4 May	#3 NDDP Racing	#4 Goodsmile Racing & Team Ukyo
2	(Japan) Fuji Speedway; Report	4 May	(Japan) Kazuki Hoshino (Spain) Lucas Ordóñez	(Japan) Tatsuya Kataoka (Japan) Nobuteru Taniguchi
3	(Japan) Autopolis; Report	1 June	#23 Nismo	#23 Nismo
3	(Japan) Autopolis; Report	1 June	(Japan) Tsugio Matsuda (Italy) Ronnie Quintarelli	(Japan) Tsugio Matsuda (Italy) Ronnie Quintarelli
3	(Japan) Autopolis; Report	1 June	#61 R&D Sport	#55 Autobacs Racing Team Aguri
3	(Japan) Autopolis; Report	1 June	(Japan) Takuto Iguchi (Japan) Kota Sasaki	(Japan) Takashi Kobayashi (Japan) Shinichi Takagi
4	(Japan) Sportsland SUGO; Report	20 July	#36 Lexus Team Petronas TOM'S	#1 Lexus Team ZENT Cerumo
4	(Japan) Sportsland SUGO; Report	20 July	(Japan) Kazuki Nakajima (United Kingdom) James Rossiter	(Japan) Yuji Tachikawa (Japan) Kohei Hirate
4	(Japan) Sportsland SUGO; Report	20 July	#10 Gainer	#88 JLOC
4	(Japan) Sportsland SUGO; Report	20 July	(Japan) Masayuki Ueda (Japan) Hideki Yamauchi	(Japan) Takayuki Aoki (Japan) Manabu Orido
5	(Japan) Fuji Speedway; Report	10 August	#17 Keihin Real Racing	#18 Weider Modulo Dome Racing
5	(Japan) Fuji Speedway; Report	10 August	(Japan) Toshihiro Kaneishi (Japan) Koudai Tsukakoshi	(France) Frédéric Makowiecki (Japan) Naoki Yamamoto
5	(Japan) Fuji Speedway; Report	10 August	#61 R&D Sport	#61 R&D Sport
5	(Japan) Fuji Speedway; Report	10 August	(Japan) Takuto Iguchi (Japan) Kota Sasaki	(Japan) Takuto Iguchi (Japan) Kota Sasaki
6	(Japan) Suzuka Circuit; Report	31 August	#36 Lexus Team Petronas TOM'S	#36 Lexus Team Petronas TOM'S
6	(Japan) Suzuka Circuit; Report	31 August	(Japan) Kazuki Nakajima (United Kingdom) James Rossiter	(Japan) Kazuki Nakajima (United Kingdom) James Rossiter
6	(Japan) Suzuka Circuit; Report	31 August	#55 Autobacs Racing Team Aguri	#60 LM corsa
6	(Japan) Suzuka Circuit; Report	31 August	(Japan) Takashi Kobayashi (Japan) Shinichi Takagi	(Japan) Akira Iida (Japan) Hiroki Yoshimoto (Japan) Shinya Sato
7	(Thailand) Chang International Circuit; Report	5 October	#46 MOLA	#36 Lexus Team Petronas TOM'S
7	(Thailand) Chang International Circuit; Report	5 October	(Japan) Satoshi Motoyama (Japan) Masataka Yanagida	(Japan) Kazuki Nakajima (United Kingdom) James Rossiter
7	(Thailand) Chang International Circuit; Report	5 October	#99 i-Mobile-AAS	#3 NDDP Racing
7	(Thailand) Chang International Circuit; Report	5 October	(Switzerland) Alexandre Imperatori (Thailand) Vutthikorn Inthraphuvasak	(Japan) Kazuki Hoshino (Spain) Lucas Ordóñez
8	(Japan) Twin Ring Motegi; Report	16 November	#23 Nismo	#23 Nismo
8	(Japan) Twin Ring Motegi; Report	16 November	(Japan) Tsugio Matsuda (Italy) Ronnie Quintarelli	(Japan) Tsugio Matsuda (Italy) Ronnie Quintarelli
8	(Japan) Twin Ring Motegi; Report	16 November	#11 Gainer	#11 Gainer
8	(Japan) Twin Ring Motegi; Report	16 November	(Japan) Katsuyuki Hiranaka (Sweden) Björn Wirdheim	(Japan) Katsuyuki Hiranaka (Sweden) Björn Wirdheim

== Standings ==
=== GT500 Drivers championship ===
Scoring system

Position	1st	2nd	3rd	4th	5th	6th	7th	8th	9th	10th
Points	20	15	11	8	6	5	4	3	2	1
Suzuka	25	18	13	10	8	6	5	4	3	2

Rank	Driver	No.	OKA (Japan)	FUJ (Japan)	AUT (Japan)	SUG (Japan)	FUJ (Japan)	SUZ (Japan)	BUR (Thailand)	MOT (Japan)	Pts.
1	(Japan) Tsugio Matsuda (Italy) Ronnie Quintarelli	23	7	8	1	14	2	2	10	1	81
2	(Italy) Andrea Caldarelli (Japan) Daisuke Ito	37	1	5	4	2	9	7	4	2	79
3	(United Kingdom) James Rossiter	36	13	9	5	4	5	1	1	10	68
4	(Japan) Naoki Yamamoto	18	5	10	7	8	1	3	5	3	64
5	(Japan) Kazuki Nakajima	36	13			4	5	1	1	10	60
6	(Brazil) João Paulo de Oliveira (Japan) Hironobu Yasuda	12	3	1	3	9	8	10	3	13	60
7	(Japan) Yuji Kunimoto (Japan) Kazuya Oshima	6	2	3	9	5	13	5	9	11	44
8	(Japan) Kohei Hirate (Japan) Yuji Tachikawa	1	14	2	12	1	14	8	11	7	43
9	(France) Frédéric Makowiecki	18				8	1	3	5		42
10	(Germany) Michael Krumm (Japan) Daiki Sasaki	24	12	4	13	10	15	9	2	4	35
11	(Japan) Satoshi Motoyama (Japan) Masataka Yanagida	46	10	Ret	2	7	6	Ret	13	5	31
12	(Japan) Toshihiro Kaneishi (Japan) Koudai Tsukakoshi	17	6	Ret	Ret	3	4	Ret	12	15	24
13	(Japan) Hiroaki Ishiura (United Kingdom) Oliver Jarvis	39	4	6	11	6	12	11	7	9	24
14	(Japan) Takashi Kogure (Japan) Hideki Mutoh	100	9	Ret	6	11	7	6	8	8	23
15	(Japan) Yuhi Sekiguchi (Japan) Juichi Wakisaka	19	11	7	8	12	11	Ret	6	6	17
16	(Italy) Vitantonio Liuzzi (Japan) Kosuke Matsuura	8	8	Ret	Ret	15	10	4	Ret	12	14
17	(Belgium) Bertrand Baguette (Japan) Daisuke Nakajima	32	15	Ret	10	13	3	12	Ret	14	12
18	(Japan) Takuya Izawa	18								3	11
19	(France) Jean-Karl Vernay	18	5	10	7						11
20	(Japan) Ryo Hirakawa	36		9	5						8
Rank	Driver	No.	OKA (Japan)	FUJ (Japan)	AUT (Japan)	SUG (Japan)	FUJ (Japan)	SUZ (Japan)	BUR (Thailand)	MOT (Japan)	Pts.

Colour	Result
Gold	Winner
Silver	Second place
Bronze	Third place
Green	Points classification
Blue	Non-points classification
Blue	Non-classified finish (NC)
Purple	Retired, not classified (Ret)
Red	Did not qualify (DNQ)
Red	Did not pre-qualify (DNPQ)
Black	Disqualified (DSQ)
White	Did not start (DNS)
White	Withdrew (WD)
White	Race cancelled (C)
Blank	Did not practice (DNP)
Blank	Did not arrive (DNA)
Blank	Excluded (EX)

==== GT500 Teams' standings ====
Rank	Team	No.	OKA (Japan)	FUJ (Japan)	AUT (Japan)	SUG (Japan)	FUJ (Japan)	SUZ (Japan)	BUR (Thailand)	MOT (Japan)	Pts.
1	Nismo	23	7	8	1	14	2	2	10	1	102
2	Lexus Team KeePer TOM'S	37	1	5	4	2	9	7	4	2	101
3	Lexus Team Petronas TOM'S	36	13	9	5	4	5	1	1	10	88
4	Weider Modulo Dome Racing	18	5	10	7	8	1	3	5	3	83
5	Team Impul	12	3	1	3	9	8	10	3	13	78
6	Lexus Team LeMans ENEOS	6	2	3	9	5	13	5	9	11	62
7	Lexus Team ZENT Cerumo	1	14	2	12	1	14	8	11	7	61
8	Kondo Racing	24	12	4	13	10	15	9	2	4	51
9	MOLA	46	10	Ret	2	7	6	Ret	13	5	45
10	Lexus Team SARD	39	4	6	11	6	12	11	7	9	43
11	Team Kunimitsu	100	9	Ret	6	11	7	6	8	8	39
12	Keihin Real Racing	17	6	Ret	Ret	3	4	Ret	12	15	34
13	Lexus Team WedsSport Bandoh	19	11	7	8	12	11	Ret	6	6	32
14	Autobacs Racing Team Aguri	8	8	Ret	Ret	15	10	4	Ret	12	25
15	Nakajima Racing	32	15	Ret	10	13	3	12	Ret	14	21
Rank	Team	No.	OKA (Japan)	FUJ (Japan)	AUT (Japan)	SUG (Japan)	FUJ (Japan)	SUZ (Japan)	BUR (Thailand)	MOT (Japan)	Pts.

=== GT300 Drivers championship ===
Rank	Driver	No.	OKA (Japan)	FUJ (Japan)	AUT (Japan)	SUG (Japan)	FUJ (Japan)	SUZ (Japan)	BUR (Thailand)	MOT (Japan)	Pts.
1	(Japan) Tatsuya Kataoka (Japan) Nobuteru Taniguchi	4	1	1	16	15	4	5	3	3	78
2	(Japan) Katsuyuki Hiranaka (Sweden) Björn Wirdheim	11	3	2	3	Ret	2	10	8	1	78
3	(Japan) Seiji Ara (Germany) Jörg Müller	7	2	4	15	8	7	3	2	7	62
4	(Japan) Kazuki Hoshino (Spain) Lucas Ordóñez	3	4	5	4	9	10	19	1	8	48
5	(Japan) Takuto Iguchi (Japan) Kota Sasaki	61	21	12	2	14	1	9	5	17	44
6	(Japan) Hiroki Yoshimoto	60	22	21	7	10	5	1	4	15	44
7	(Japan) Akira Iida	60	22	21	7	10	5	1	4		44
8	(Japan) Morio Nitta (Japan) Koki Saga	31	Ret	6	Ret	Ret	6	2	17	2	43
9	(Japan) Haruki Kurosawa	65	5	8	10	2	8	Ret	Ret	6	33
10	(Japan) Yuhki Nakayama (Japan) Tomoki Nojiri	0	9	3	5	11	18	8	9	13	26
11	(Japan) Takashi Kobayashi (Japan) Shinichi Takagi	55	6	18	1	16	22	16	13	12	25
12	(Japan) Shinya Hosokawa (Japan) Koji Yamanishi	86	7	Ret	6	6	3	17	Ret	20	25
13	(Japan) Tsubasa Kurosawa	65		8	10	2	8	Ret	Ret		22
14	(Japan) Tomonobu Fujii	21	8	14	18	3	23	Ret	Ret	4	22
15	(United Kingdom) Richard Lyons	21	8		18	3	23	Ret	Ret	4	22
16	(Japan) Takayuki Aoki (Japan) Manabu Orido	88	11	Ret	11	1	21	13	18	11	20
17	(Japan) Masayuki Ueda (Japan) Hideki Yamauchi	10	10	20	12	13	14	4	11	5	18
18	(Japan) Yuichi Nakayama	31						2			18
19	(Japan) Masaki Kano	50	13	15	8	4	16	Ret	6	10	17
20	(Brazil) Augusto Farfus	7						3			13
21	(Japan) Hideto Yasuoka	50	13	15	8	4	16	Ret		10	12
22	(Japan) Shogo Mitsuyama (Japan) Naoki Yokomizo	67	19	9	9	5	17	Ret		16	10
23	(Japan) Kyosuke Mineo	65/33/67	5	8	14		9	Ret	16	21	8
24	(Japan) Akihiro Tsuzuki	33	17	17	14	12	9	6	16	21	8
25	(Japan) Takuya Shirasaka	9	12	13	19	17	15	7		9	7
26	(Germany) Jörg Bergmeister	33				12		6			6
27	(Germany) Tim Bergmeister	33	17	17				6			6
28	(Thailand) Nanin Indra-Payoong	50		15				Ret	6		5
29	(Japan) Naoya Gamou	65								6	5
30	(Portugal) André Couto	9			19	17	15	7			5
31	(Japan) Taiyo Iida	9		13				7			5
32	(Japan) Yuki Iwasaki (Japan) Masami Kageyama	30	Ret	10	23	7	13	11	12	Ret	5
33	(Japan) Hiroki Katoh (Japan) Kazuho Takahashi	2	14	7	13	21	12	12	15	19	4
34	(Japan) Hisashi Wada	22	20	11	17	20	11	15	10	14	2
35	(Japan) Masaki Jyonai	22					11	15	10	14	2
36	(Japan) Yuya Sakamoto	9	12	13						9	2
-	(Japan) Takeshi Tsuchiya	22/194	20	11	17				14		0
-	(Japan) Tohjiro Azuma	30						11			0
-	(Japan) Hiroshi Hamaguchi	2						12			0
-	(Japan) Kazuki Hiramine	88						13			0
-	(Japan) Hiroshi Takamori (Japan) Masaki Tanaka	48	18	DNS	22	19	20	14		Ret	0
-	(Japan) Ryuichiro Tomita	48						14	19		0
-	(Netherlands) Carlo van Dam	21		14							0
-	(Japan) Tetsuji Tamanaka	5	15	19	20		19	18			0
-	(Japan) Junichiro Yamashita	5	15	19			19				0
-	(Japan) Shinya Sato	60						1		15	0
-	(Japan) Hiroki Yoshida	360	16	16		18	24	20		18	0
-	(Japan) Atsushi Tanaka	360	16	16	21		24	20		18	0
-	(Japan) Ryuju Fujita	360		16	21	18		20			0
-	(Japan) Kazuya Tsuruta	5		19				18			0
-	(Japan) Naoya Yamano	5			20			18			0
-	(Belgium) Wolfgang Reip	3						19			0
-	(Japan) Keiichi Inoue	48		DNS					19		0
-	(Japan) Tetsuya Tanaka	22				20					0
-	(Thailand) Vutthikorn Inthraphuvasak (Switzerland) Alexandre Imperatori	99							7		0
-	(Japan) Ryō Michigami	0						8			0
-	(Thailand) Nattavude Charoensukhawatana	194							14		0
-	(Germany) Christopher Haase	21						Ret			0
Rank	Driver	No.	OKA (Japan)	FUJ (Japan)	AUT (Japan)	SUG (Japan)	FUJ (Japan)	SUZ (Japan)	BUR (Thailand)	MOT (Japan)	Pts.

==== GT300 Teams' standings ====
Rank	Team	No.	OKA (Japan)	FUJ (Japan)	AUT (Japan)	SUG (Japan)	FUJ (Japan)	SUZ (Japan)	BUR (Thailand)	MOT (Japan)	Pts.
1	Gainer	11	3	2	3	Ret	2	10	8	1	97
2	Goodsmile Racing & Team Ukyo	4	1	1	16	15	4	5	3	3	96
3	BMW Sports Trophy Team Studie	7	2	4	15	8	7	3	2	7	82
4	NDDP Racing	3	4	5	4	9	10	19	1	8	68
5	LM corsa	60	22	21	7	10	5	1	4	15	62
6	R&D Sport	61	21	12	2	14	1	9	5	17	60
7	apr	31	Ret	6	Ret	Ret	6	2	17	2	56
8	Leon Racing	65	5	8	10	2	8	Ret	Ret	6	51
9	Team Mugen	0	9	3	5	11	18	8	9	13	44
10	Autobacs Racing Team Aguri	55	6	18	1	16	22	16	13	12	41
11	JLOC	86	7	Ret	6	6	3	17	Ret	20	37
12	JLOC	88	11	Ret	11	1	21	13	18	11	35
13	Audi Team Hitotsuyama	21	8	14	18	3	23	Ret	Ret	4	34
14	Arnage Racing	50	13	15	8	4	16	Ret	6	10	34
15	Gainer	10	10	20	12	13	14	4	11	5	32
16	Team Taisan	67	19	9	9	5	17	Ret		16	24
17	Porsche Team KTR	33	17	17	14	12	9	6	16	21	18
18	Pacific Direction Racing	9	12	13	19	17	15	7		9	18
19	R'QS Motorsports	22	20	11	17	20	11	15	10	14	18
20	Cars Tokai Dream28	2	14	7	13	21	12	12	15	19	16
21	apr	30	Ret	10	23	7	13	11	12	Ret	15
22	Dijon Racing	48	18	DNS	22	19	20	14		Ret	8
23	Team Mach	5	15	19	20		19	18			7
24	Tomei Sports	360	16	16	21	18	24	20		18	7
-	i-mobile-AAS	99							7		0
-	Toyota Team Thailand	194							14		0
Rank	Team	No.	OKA (Japan)	FUJ (Japan)	AUT (Japan)	SUG (Japan)	FUJ (Japan)	SUZ (Japan)	BUR (Thailand)	MOT (Japan)	Pts.
