= Yuta Fujiwara =

Japanese racing driver (born 2006)

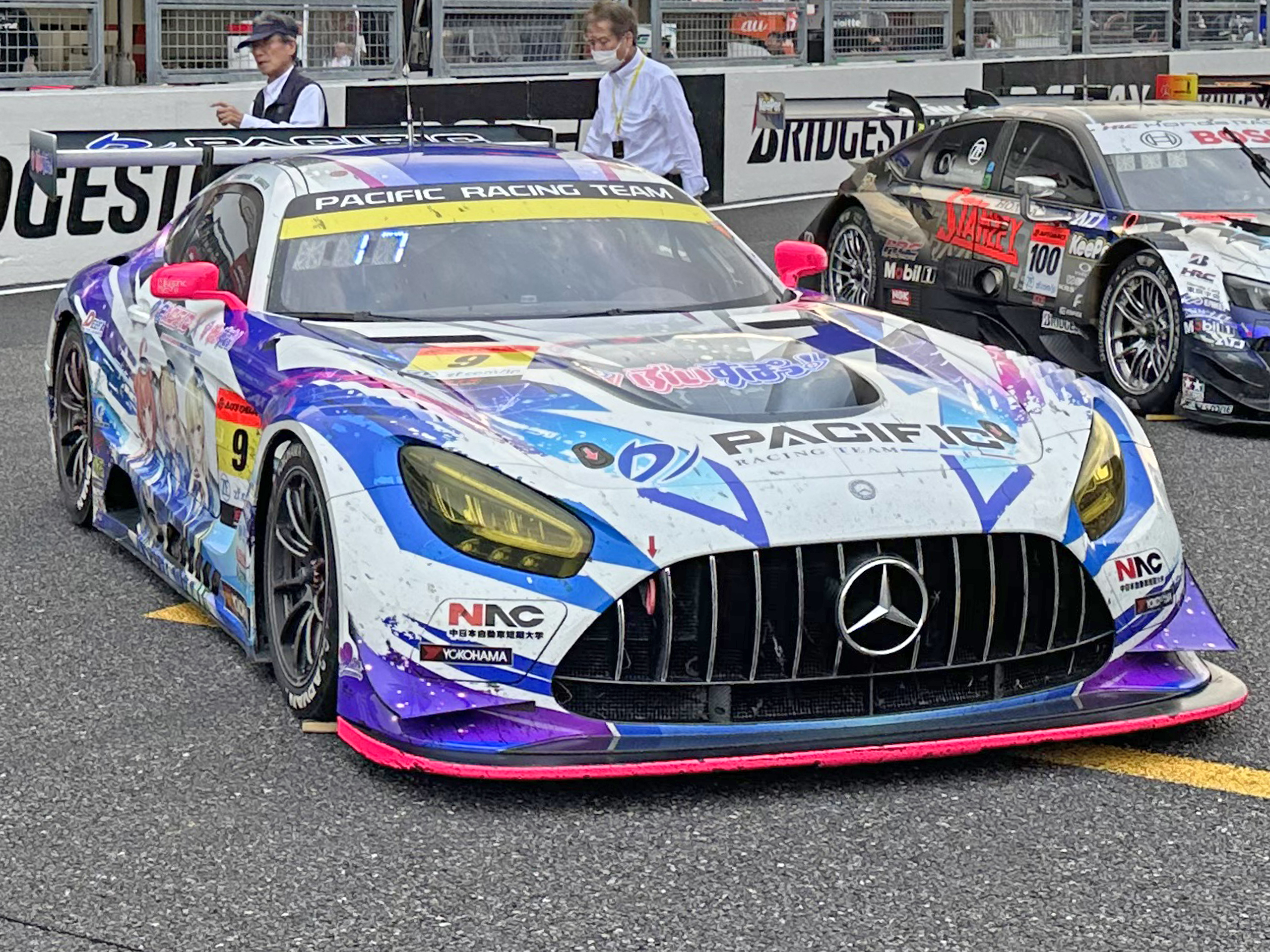
- Fujiwara in 2024
- Nationality: (Japan) Japanese
- Born: 15 February 2006 (age 20) Sakai, Japan

Super GT – GT300 career
- Debut season: 2024
- Current team: Pacific Racing Team
- Car number: 9
- Starts: 15
- Wins: 1
- Podiums: 1
- Poles: 1
- Fastest laps: 1
- Best finish: 23rd in 2026

Previous series
- 2024 2022–2023: Formula Regional Japanese Championship; F4 Japanese Championship

Yuta Fujiwara (藤原 優汰, Fujiwara Yūta; born 15 February 2006 in Sakai) is a Japanese racing driver who last competed for Pacific Racing Team in the GT300 class of Super GT. He also competes in professional drifting in the D1 Grand Prix series.

== Career ==
In 2022, Fujiwara made his single-seater debut in the F4 Japanese Championship for Bionic Jack Racing. Despite a mid-season switch to Akiland Racing, Fujiwara only scored a best result of 11th at Autopolis and ended the season 22nd in the points with no points.

In 2023, Fujiwara stayed with Akiland Racing for his sophomore season in the F4 Japanese Championship. In the season opening race at Fuji, Fujiwara finished tenth to score his maiden points in the championship. Following three score-less rounds, Fujiwara returned to the points at Sugo, by finishing sixth in race two. He finished 17th in the standings on nine points.

After passing the 2024 Super GT pre-season rookie test, Fujiwara was announced to be joining Pacific Racing Team as its third driver alongside Ryohei Sakaguchi and Yusuke Tomibayashi. On his debut at Fuji, Fujiwara finished 12th, which would be his best result of the season. During 2024, Fujiwara returned to Akiland Racing to compete in the first round of the newly-created F110 Cup at Okayama. He took both poles, fastest laps and wins to score maximum points from the two races. Also during 2024, Fujiwara made his Formula Regional debut in the final round of the 2024 Formula Regional Japanese Championship at Fuji Speedway for Rn-sports. Fujiwara finished sixth on debut and scored his first top-five in race two. Alongside his rookie campaign in Super GT, Fujiwara made his D1GP Lights debut and took his first solo-run win at the third round of the season.

The following year, Fujiwara returned to Pacific Racing Team as their third driver for the 2025 season, scoring a best result of 17th at Motegi in his third race of the season. During 2025, Fujiwara also raced part-time in the ST-4 class of Super Taikyu for Overdrive Racing, scoring a lone class win at Suzuka and helping the team secure fourth in points. In 2026, Fujiwara continued to drive with Pacific Racing Team as he will make his full-time debut in Super GT, as well as returning to Over Drive to race in the ST-4 class of Super Taikyu. In the former, Fujiwara helped teammate Tomibayashi to pole, as well as their first win in GT300 competition at Suzuka.

== Karting record ==
=== Karting career summary ===
Season	Series	Team	Position
2015	Rotax Max Challenge Japan – Micro Max	K-TEC with Peter Pan	3rd
2015	Rotax Max Challenge Japan Mizunami Series – Micro Max	K-TEC with Peter Pan	1st
2015	Rotax Max Festival Japan – Micro Max	K-TEC with Peter Pan	5th
2016	Rotax Max Challenge Japan – Mini Max	K-TEC with Peter Pan	1st
2016	Rotax Max Challenge Japan Mizunami Series – Mini Max	K-TEC with Peter Pan	1st
2016	Rotax Max Festival Japan – Mini Max	K-TEC with Peter Pan	1st
2016	Rotax Challenge Grand Finals – Mini Max	Eiko Japan	32nd
2017	Rotax Max Challenge Japan – Junior Max	K-TEC with Peter Pan	5th
2017	Rotax Max Challenge Japan Mizunami Series – Junior Max	K-TEC with Peter Pan	5th
2017	Rotax Max Festival Japan – Junior Max	K-TEC with Peter Pan	3rd
2018	Rotax Max Challenge Japan – Junior Max	K-TEC with Peter Pan	13th
2018	Rotax Max Challenge Japan Mizunami Series – Junior Max	K-TEC with Peter Pan	3rd
2018	Rotax Max Festival Japan – Junior Max	K-TEC with Peter Pan	NC
2019	Rotax Max Challenge Japan – Senior Max	KP Buzz	3rd
2020	Rotax Max Challenge Japan – Senior Max	K-TEC with Peter Pan	154th

== Racing record ==
=== Racing career summary ===
Season	Series	Team	Races	Wins	Poles	F/Laps	Podiums	Points	Position
2022	F4 Japanese Championship	Bionic Jack Racing	6	0	0	0	0	0	22nd
2022	F4 Japanese Championship	Akiland Racing	8	0	0	0	0	0	22nd
2023	F4 Japanese Championship	Akiland Racing	14	0	0	0	0	9	17th
2024	Super GT – GT300	Pacific Racing Team	5	0	0	0	0	0	NC
2024	F110 Cup	Akiland Racing	2	2	2	2	2	50	**2nd**
2024	Formula Regional Japanese Championship	Rn-sports	2	0	0	0	0	18	19th
2025	Super GT – GT300	Pacific Racing Team	3	0	0	0	0	0	NC
2025	Super Taikyu – ST-4	Over Drive	5	1	2	0	2	97.5‡	4th‡
2026	Super GT – GT300	Pacific Racing Team	6	1	1	1	1	30	23rd
2026	Super Taikyu – ST-4	Over Drive							

^{‡} Team standings

=== Complete F4 Japanese Championship results ===
(key) (Races in bold indicate pole position) (Races in italics indicate fastest lap)

Year	Team	1	2	3	4	5	6	7	8	9	10	11	12	13	14	DC	Points
2022	Bionic Jack Racing	FUJ1; 1; 20	FUJ1; 2; 17	SUZ1; 1; 23	SUZ1; 2; 22	FUJ2; 1 Ret	FUJ2; 2; 22									22nd	0
2022	Akiland Racing							SUZ2; 1; 25	SUZ2; 2; 14	SUG; 1; 19	SUG; 2; 20	AUT; 1; 14	AUT; 2; 11	MOT; 1; 14	MOT; 2; 13	22nd	0
2023	Akiland Racing	FUJ1; 2; 10	FUJ1; 1; 14	SUZ1; 1; 13	SUZ1; 2; 12	FUJ2; 1; 12	FUJ2; 2; 14	SUZ2; 1; 12	SUZ2; 2; 12	SUG; 1 Ret	SUG; 2; 6	AUT; 1; 15	AUT; 2; 13	MOT; 1; 34	MOT; 2; 13	17th	9

=== Complete Super GT results ===
Year	Team	Car	Class	1	2	3	4	5	6	7	8	9	DC	Points
2024	Pacific Racing Team	Mercedes-AMG GT3 Evo	GT300	OKA	FUJ; 12	SUZ; 17	FUJ; Ret	SUZ	SUG; 20	AUT	MOT; 17		NC	0
2025	Pacific Racing Team	Mercedes-AMG GT3 Evo	GT300	OKA	FUJ; 18	SEP	FS1	FS2	SUZ	SUG	AUT; 23	MOT; 17	NC	0
2026	Pacific Racing Team	BMW M4 GT3 Evo	GT300	OKA; 23	FUJ; 22	FUJ; 16	**SUZ**; 1	SUG; 12	AUT; 21	MOT	MOT; Ret		23rd	30

=== Complete Formula Regional Japanese Championship results ===
(key) (Races in bold indicate pole position) (Races in italics indicate fastest lap)

Year	Entrant	1	2	3	4	5	6	7	8	9	10	11	12	13	14	Pos	Points
2024	Rn-sports	SUZ; 1	SUZ; 2	SUZ; 3	SUG; 1	SUG; 2	OKA; 1	OKA; 2	OKA; 3	MOT; 1	MOT; 2	FUJ1; 1	FUJ1; 2	FUJ2; 1; 6	FUJ2; 2; 5	19th	18
