= Kyosuke Mineo =

Japanese racing driver (born 1974)

Kyosuke Mineo 峰尾恭輔
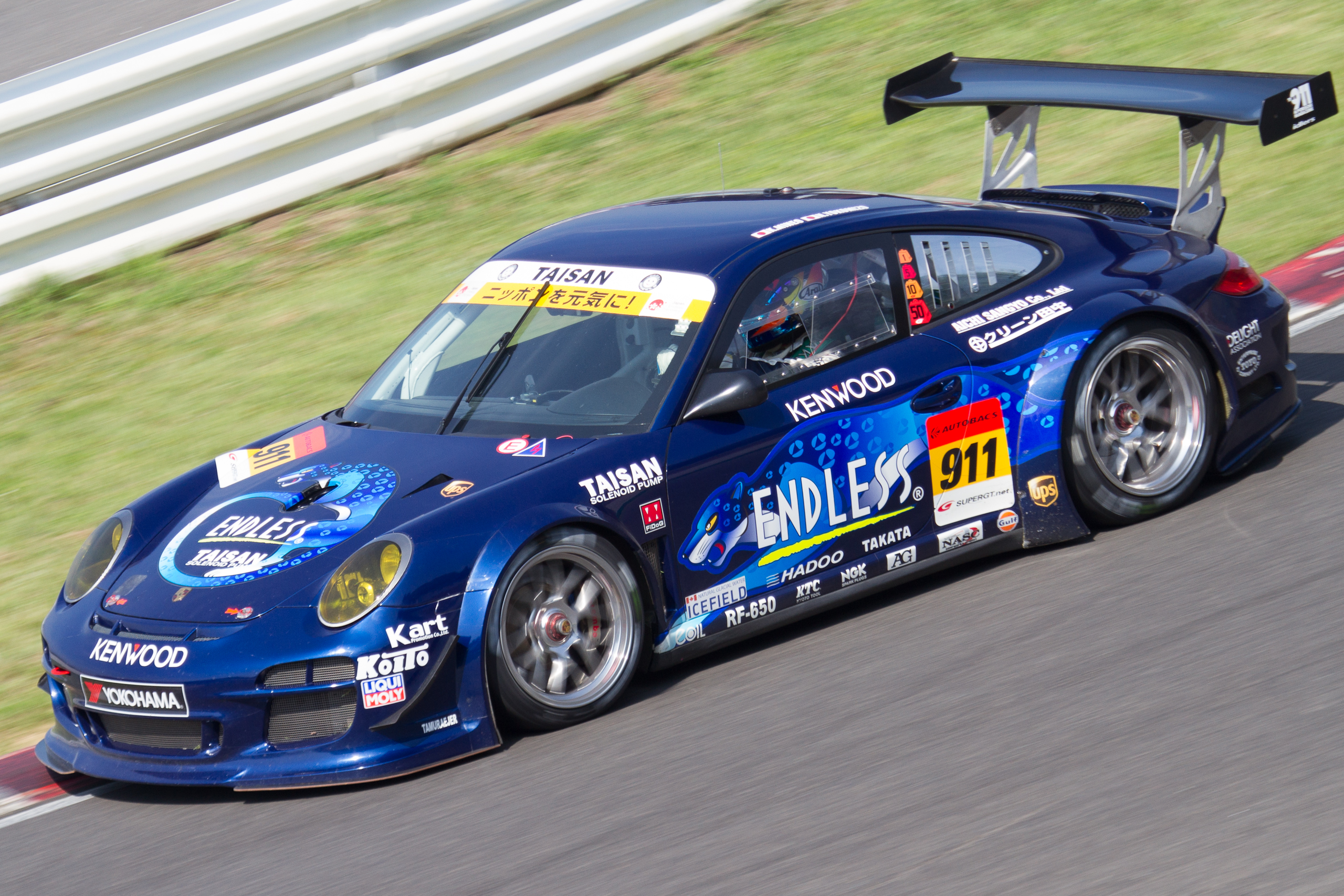
- Mineo in 2012
- Nationality: (Japan) Japanese
- Born: 16 December 1974 (age 51) Hachioji, Japan
- Categorisation: FIA Silver

Championship titles
- 2012 2003 1997: Super GT – GT300; Netz Cup Altezza Series; Saurus Junior East Japan Series

Awards
- 2009: Mitsubishi Motors/Ralliart Driver of the Year

Kyosuke Mineo (峰尾 恭輔, Mineo Kyōsuke; born 16 December 1974) is a Japanese racing driver who last competed in the GT300 class of Super GT for Pacific Racing with Good Speed.

He was Super GT champion in 2012 in GT300 for Team Taisan Endless, and is also a three-time Super Taikyu champion.

== Career ==
Mineo began his racing career in 1996, racing in the Nissan Saurus Junior Kanto Series. After winning the East Japan Series the following year, Mineo then spent two years in the Formula Toyota Main Series, before progressing to the Japanese Formula 3 Championship with DTM in 2000, scoring a lone podium at Fuji. Three seasons in the Netz Cup Altezza Series then followed, in which he clinched the title in 2003, before joining Autobacs Racing Team Aguri to race primarily in Super Taikyu for the following two seasons. During those two seasons, Mineo finished third in the Class N+ standings with five podiums and then scoring four ST-5 wins in 2005 en route to runner-up honours.

In 2006, Mineo joined Porsche-fielding Endless Sports to make his debut in the GT300 class of Super GT, taking a lone podium at Fuji as he ended the year 21st in points. In parallel, Mineo also raced for the team in the ST-2 class of Super Taikyu, in which he scored a class podium at Okayama. Two seasons with Toyota-affiliated apr then ensued, in which Mineo took his second series podium at Sugo in 2008, a year in which he finished 14th in points. During 2008, Mineo also raced for Endless Sports in the ST-2 class of Super Taikyu, scoring wins at Motegi and Fuji.

Staying with Endless for the 2009 Super Taikyu season, Mineo scored four wins and three other podiums to secure the ST-2 title and was given the Mitsubishi Motors/Ralliart Driver of the Year award at season's end. Towards the end of the year, Mineo reunited with apr to compete in the final five races of the 2009 Super GT Series. Remaining in ST-2 with Endless for the following two seasons, Mineo won three times in 2010 en-route to runner-up honours, before repeating the same feat a year later with four wins to his name. In the midst of this, Mineo finished on the podium at the 2010 Pokka GT Summer Special for ASL-affiliated Autobacs Racing Team Aguri, and raced for Team Taisan on a full-time basis in the 2011 Super GT Series.

Remaining with the Porsche customer team for 2012, now in a partnership with Endless, Mineo won the season-ending race at Motegi and scored three other podiums to clinch the GT300 title along with Naoki Yokomizo. In parallel, Mineo continued with Endless to make his debut in the ST-1 class of Super Taikyu, which he won after scoring four wins and standing on the podium in all seven races. Continuing with Team Taisan Endless for the following year, Mineo scored a best result of third at Sugo to finish 12th in the GT300 standings in his title defence season. During 2013, Mineo also made a one-off appearance for the team in the Asian Le Mans Series at Inje, and led Endless in the GT3 class of Super Taikyu.

After a season spent bouncing around teams in GT300 and scoring a lone overall win in Super Taikyu for Endless en route to second in ST-X, Mineo joined Ferrari-fielding Direction Racing for the 2015 Super GT season, in which he took a best result of fourth at Autopolis. In parallel, Mineo raced with Endless in Super Taikyu for his second consecutive season in the ST-X class, in which he scored three wins and two other podiums to seal the title. Remaining with Endless for another season in ST-X, Mineo won twice and finished on the podium in every race he started to secure runner-up in the ST-X standings. During 2016, Mineo also raced in the GT300 class of Super GT for Team Direction, in the then-new Lamborghini Huracán GT3.

In 2017, Mineo joined Porsche customer team Pacific Racing with Gulf Racing. In his eighth full-time season in Super GT, Mineo took a lone podium at Okayama as he ended the year eighth in GT300. One-off appearances in Super GT and Super Taikyu then followed in 2018, before Mineo returned to Pacific Racing for his full-time return in the former the following year, in which he took a best result of ninth at Sugo.

== Personal life ==
In July 2021, Mineo opened up Supersonics, a sports car specialty story in his hometown of Hachioji.

== Racing record ==
=== Racing career summary ===
Season	Series	Team	Races	Wins	Poles	F/Laps	Podiums	Points	Position
1996	Nissan Saurus Junior Kanto Series		3	0	0	0	0		
1996	Brains Super Cup Race		1	0	0	0	0	—N/a	11th
1997	Nissan Saurus Junior East Japan Series		5	4	?	?	4		**1st**
1998	Formula Toyota Main Series		9	0	0	0	0		10th
1999	Formula Toyota Main Series		10	0	0	0	2		5th
2000	Japanese Formula 3 Championship	DTM	5	0	0	0	1	4	9th
2001	Netz Cup Altezza Series		9	0	0	0	2		8th
2002	Netz Cup Altezza Series		9	0	0	0	1		9th
2002	24 Hours of Tokachi – Class N+		1	0	0	0	0	—N/a	4th
2002	Integra East Japan Series		1	0	0	0	0	0	NC†
2003	Netz Cup Altezza Series		7	2	?	?	4		**1st**
2003	Integra One-Make Series Intercup		1	0	0	0	0	0	NC†
2003	Integra One-Make East Japan Series		1	0	0	0	0	0	NC†
2003	24 Hours of Tokachi – Class N+		1	0	0	0	1	—N/a	**2nd**
2004	Super Taikyu – Class N+	Autobacs Racing Team Aguri	8	0	1	0	5		**3rd‡**
2005	Super Taikyu – ST-5	ARTA with SPIRIT	8	4	2	0	6		**2nd‡**
2006	Super GT – GT300	Endless Sports	9	0	0	0	1	18	21st
2006	Super Taikyu – ST-2	Endless Sports	7	0	0	0	1		
2007	Super GT – GT300	apr	9	0	0	0	0	18	18th
2008	Super Taikyu – ST-2	Endless Sports	8	2	1	0	4		
2008	Super GT – GT300	apr	8	0	0	0	1	34	14th
2008	Super GT – GT300	Autobacs Racing Team Aguri	1	0	0	0	0	34	14th
2009	Super Taikyu – ST-2	Endless Sports	8	4	6	0	7		**1st‡**
2009	Super GT – GT300	apr	5	0	0	0	0	12	15th
2010	Super Taikyu – ST-2	Endless Sports	8	3	3	0	6		**2nd‡**
2010	Super GT – GT300	Autobacs Racing Team Aguri	1	0	0	0	1	0	NC
2011	Super Taikyu – ST-2	Endless Sports	7	4	7	0	5		**2nd‡**
2011	Super GT – GT300	Team Taisan	8	0	0	0	0	0	NC
2012	Super GT – GT300	Team Taisan Endless	8	1	1	0	4	82	**1st**
2012	Super Taikyu – ST-1	Endless Sports	7	4	2	0	7		**1st‡**
2013	Asian Le Mans Series – GTC	Team Taisan Ken Endless	1	0	0	0	1	18	11th
2013	Super GT – GT300	Team Taisan Ken Endless	9	0	0	0	1	25	12th
2013	Super Taikyu – GT3	Endless Sports	7	0	0	0	2	49.5‡	5th‡
2014	Super GT – GT300	Leon Racing	2	0	0	0	0	8	23rd
2014	Super GT – GT300	Porsche Team KTR	4	0	0	0	0	8	23rd
2014	Super GT – GT300	Team Taisan	1	0	0	0	0	8	23rd
2014	Super Taikyu – ST-X	Endless Sports	5	1	0	0	5	84‡	**2nd‡**
2015	Super GT – GT300	Direction Racing	8	0	0	0	0	12	17th
2015	Super Taikyu – ST-X	Endless Sports	6	3	1	0	5	108‡	**1st‡**
2016	Super GT – GT300	Lamborghini Team Direction Shift	5	0	0	0	0	0	NC
2016	Super Taikyu – ST-X	Endless Sports	6	2	0	0	6	116.5‡	**2nd‡**
2017	Super GT – GT300	Pacific Racing with Gulf Racing	8	0	0	0	1	31	8th
2018	Super Taikyu – ST-X	Endless Sports	1	0	0	0	0	88‡	**3rd‡**
2018	Super GT – GT300	Pacific Racing with Gulf Racing	1	0	0	0	0	0	NC
2019	Super GT – GT300	Pacific Racing with Good Speed	8	0	0	0	0	2	27th

^{†} As Mineo was a guest driver, he was ineligible to score points.

^{‡} Team standings.

=== Complete Super GT results ===
Year	Team	Car	Class	1	2	3	4	5	6	7	8	9	DC	Points
2006	Endless Sports	Porsche 996 GT3-R	GT300	SUZ; 9	OKA; 22	FUJ; 3	SEP; 6	SUG; Ret	SUZ; Ret	MOT; 11	AUT; 14	FUJ; 20	21st	18
2007	apr	Toyota MR-S	GT300	SUZ; 8	OKA; 9	FUJ; 6	SEP; 15	SUG; 7	SUZ; 7	MOT; 9	AUT; Ret	FUJ; Ret	18th	18
2008	apr	Toyota MR-S	GT300	SUZ; 10	OKA; 11	FUJ; 4	SEP; 6	SUG; 3		MOT; 17	AUT; 11	FUJ; 4	14th	34
2008	Autobacs Racing Team Aguri	ASL ARTA Garaiya	GT300						SUZ; Ret				14th	34
2009	apr	Toyota Corolla Axio apr GT	GT300	OKA	SUZ	FUJ	SEP	SUG; 10	SUZ; 18	FUJ; 15	AUT; 5	MOT; 6	15th	12
2010	Autobacs Racing Team Aguri	ASL ARTA Garaiya	GT300	SUZ	OKA	FUJ	SEP	SUG	SUZ; 2	FUJ	MOT		NC	0
2011	Team Taisan	Porsche 996 GT3	GT300	OKA; 11	FUJ; 12	SEP; 13	SUG; 11	SUZ; 14	FUJ; 15	AUT; 20			NC	0
2011	Team Taisan	Ferrari F430 GT2	GT300								MOT; Ret		NC	0
2012	Team Taisan Endless	Porsche 911 GT3-R	GT300	**OKA**; 2	FUJ; 8	SEP; 2	SUG; 5	SUZ; Ret	FUJ; 4	AUT; 2	MOT; 1		1st	82
2013	Team Taisan Ken Endless	Porsche 997 GT3	GT300	OKA; 10	FUJ; NC	SEP; 11	SUG; 3	SUZ; 7	FUJ; 19	FUJ; 4	AUT; 8	MOT; 10	12th	25
2014	LEON Racing	Mercedes-Benz SLS AMG GT3	GT300	OKA; 5	FUJ; 8								23rd	8
2014	Porsche Team KTR	Porsche 911 GT3	GT300			AUT; 14	SUG	FUJ; 9		BUR; 16	MOT; 21		23rd	8
2014	Team Taisan	Nissan GT-R GT3	GT300						SUZ; Ret				23rd	8
2015	Direction Racing	Ferrari 458 Italia GT3	GT300	OKA; 11	FUJ; 13	CHA; 18	FUJ; 12	SUZ; 9	SUG; 11	AUT; 4	MOT; 10		17th	12
2016	Lamborghini Team Direction Shift	Lamborghini Huracán GT3	GT300	OKA; 16	FUJ; 17	SUG	FUJ	SUZ; 19	BUR	MOT; 27	MOT; 18		NC	0
2017	Pacific with Gulf Racing	Porsche 911 GT3 R	GT300	OKA; 3	FUJ; 10	AUT; 17	SUG; 10	FUJ; 5	SUZ; 8	CHA; 14	MOT; 4		8th	31
2018	Pacific with Gulf Racing	Porsche 911 GT3 R	GT300	OKA	FUJ	SUZ	CHA	FUJ; 15	SUG	AUT	MOT		NC	0
2019	Pacific Racing with Good Speed	Porsche 911 GT3 R	GT300	OKA; 15	FUJ; 22	SUZ; 22	CHA; 16	FUJ; 19	AUT; 22	SUG; 9	MOT; 15		27th	2

^{‡} Half points awarded as less than 75% of race distance was completed.

=== Complete Asian Le Mans Series results ===
(key) (Races in bold indicate pole position) (Races in italics indicate fastest lap)

Year	Team	Class	Car	Engine	1	2	3	4	Pos.	Points
2013	Team Taisan Ken Endless	GTC	Porsche 996 GT3-RS	Porsche M96/77 3.6 L Flat-6	INJ; 2	FUJ	ZHU	SEP	11th	18
