= 2025 6 Hours of Abu Dhabi =

Endurance automotive competition

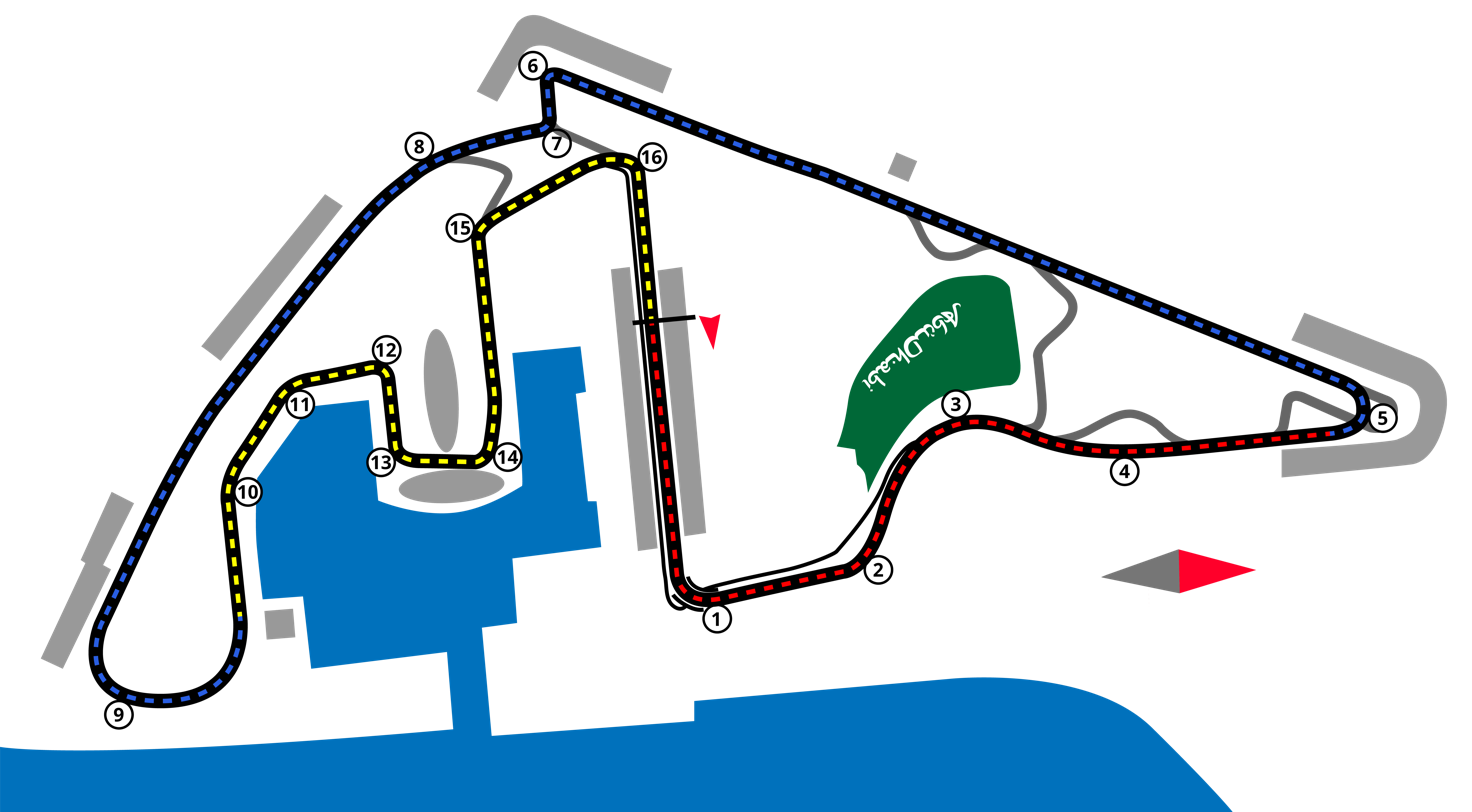
The layout of the Yas Marina Circuit, where the race was held.

The 2025 6 Hours of Abu Dhabi (formally known as the Michelin 6 Hours Abu Dhabi), was the 5th running of the 6 Hours of Abu Dhabi, an endurance race that took place at the Yas Marina Circuit on 19 January 2025. The race was the second and final round of the 2025 Middle East Trophy.

== Schedule ==
Date	Time (local: GST)	Event	Duration
Saturday, 18 January	11:30 - 13:00	Free Practice	90 Minutes
Saturday, 18 January	17:40 - 18:35	Qualifying	3x15 Minutes
Sunday, 19 January	10:30 - 16:30	Race	6 Hours

== Entries ==
Team	Car	Engine	No.	Drivers	Class
GT3
(United Arab Emirates) Manamauri Energy by Ebimotors	Porsche 911 GT3 R (992)	Porsche M97/80 4.2 L Flat-6	1	(Italy) Fabrizio Broggi	PA
(United Arab Emirates) Manamauri Energy by Ebimotors	Porsche 911 GT3 R (992)	Porsche M97/80 4.2 L Flat-6	1	(Italy) Sabino de Castro	PA
(United Arab Emirates) Manamauri Energy by Ebimotors	Porsche 911 GT3 R (992)	Porsche M97/80 4.2 L Flat-6	1	(Romania) Sergiu Nicolae	PA
(United Arab Emirates) Manamauri Energy by Ebimotors	Porsche 911 GT3 R (992)	Porsche M97/80 4.2 L Flat-6	1	(Italy) Cosimo Papi	PA
(China) Climax Racing	Mercedes-AMG GT3 Evo	Mercedes-AMG M159 6.2 L V8	2	(China) Lu Wei	Am
(China) Climax Racing	Mercedes-AMG GT3 Evo	Mercedes-AMG M159 6.2 L V8	2	(China) Zhang Yaqi	Am
(China) Climax Racing	Mercedes-AMG GT3 Evo	Mercedes-AMG M159 6.2 L V8	2	(China) Mike Zhou	Am
(Germany) Haupt Racing Team	Mercedes-AMG GT3 Evo	Mercedes-AMG M159 6.2 L V8	4	(Saudi Arabia) Reema Juffali	PA
(Germany) Haupt Racing Team	Mercedes-AMG GT3 Evo	Mercedes-AMG M159 6.2 L V8	4	(Germany) Salman Owega	PA
(Germany) Haupt Racing Team	Mercedes-AMG GT3 Evo	Mercedes-AMG M159 6.2 L V8	4	(Germany) Finn Wiebelhaus	PA
(Germany) SMP Racing (Note: SMP Racing is a Russian team, but they compete under a German flag as Russian national emblems were banned by the FIA following the Russian invasion of Ukraine.)	Mercedes-AMG GT3 Evo	Mercedes-AMG M159 6.2 L V8	7	Vitaly Petrov (Note: Borisov, Denisov, Loboda, Petrov, Pogosyan, Salikhov, Shaytar, Sirotkin, Nonikov, Sidorov, Stolyarov and Sergey & Victor Titarenko are Russian, but they compete as neutral competitors as Russian national emblems were banned by the FIA following the Russian invasion of Ukraine.)	P
(Germany) SMP Racing	Mercedes-AMG GT3 Evo	Mercedes-AMG M159 6.2 L V8	7	Dennis Remenyako	P
(Germany) SMP Racing	Mercedes-AMG GT3 Evo	Mercedes-AMG M159 6.2 L V8	7	Sergey Sirotkin	P
(Germany) SMP Racing	Mercedes-AMG GT3 Evo	Mercedes-AMG M159 6.2 L V8	7	Alexander Smolyar	P
(Germany) Team Motopark	Mercedes-AMG GT3 Evo	Mercedes-AMG M159 6.2 L V8	5	(Netherlands) Nigel Schoonderwoerd	P
(Germany) Team Motopark	Mercedes-AMG GT3 Evo	Mercedes-AMG M159 6.2 L V8	5	(Hungary) Levente Révész	P
(Germany) Team Motopark	Mercedes-AMG GT3 Evo	Mercedes-AMG M159 6.2 L V8	5	(Netherlands) Yelmer Buurman	P
(South Africa) Into Africa Racing by Dragon Racing (Note: Car No. 8 entered as Into Africa Racing by Dragon Racing. Car No. 98 entered as Dragon Racing.) (United Arab Emirates) Dragon Racing	Ferrari 296 GT3	Ferrari F163 3.0 L Turbo V6	8	(Zimbabwe) Axcil Jefferies	PA
(South Africa) Into Africa Racing by Dragon Racing (United Arab Emirates) Dragon Racing	Ferrari 296 GT3	Ferrari F163 3.0 L Turbo V6	8	(South Africa) Xollie Letlaka	PA
(South Africa) Into Africa Racing by Dragon Racing (United Arab Emirates) Dragon Racing	Ferrari 296 GT3	Ferrari F163 3.0 L Turbo V6	8	(South Africa) Stuart White	PA
(South Africa) Into Africa Racing by Dragon Racing (United Arab Emirates) Dragon Racing	Ferrari 296 GT3	Ferrari F163 3.0 L Turbo V6	8	(United States) Blake McDonald	PA
(South Africa) Into Africa Racing by Dragon Racing (United Arab Emirates) Dragon Racing	Porsche 911 GT3 R (991.2)	Porsche 4.0 L Flat-6	98	(United Kingdom) Glynn Geddie	PA
(South Africa) Into Africa Racing by Dragon Racing (United Arab Emirates) Dragon Racing	Porsche 911 GT3 R (991.2)	Porsche 4.0 L Flat-6	98	(United Kingdom) Jim Geddie	PA
(South Africa) Into Africa Racing by Dragon Racing (United Arab Emirates) Dragon Racing	Porsche 911 GT3 R (991.2)	Porsche 4.0 L Flat-6	98	(United Kingdom) Phil Keen	PA
(Switzerland) Hofor Racing	Mercedes-AMG GT3	Mercedes-AMG M159 6.2 L V8	11	(Switzerland) Michael Kroll	Am
(Switzerland) Hofor Racing	Mercedes-AMG GT3	Mercedes-AMG M159 6.2 L V8	11	(Switzerland) Chantal Prinz	Am
(Switzerland) Hofor Racing	Mercedes-AMG GT3	Mercedes-AMG M159 6.2 L V8	11	(Germany) Alexander Prinz	Am
(Switzerland) Hofor Racing	Mercedes-AMG GT3	Mercedes-AMG M159 6.2 L V8	11	(Germany) Timo Rumpfkeil	Am
(Germany) Winward Racing	Mercedes-AMG GT3 Evo	Mercedes-AMG M159 6.2 L V8	16	Viktor Shaytar	PA
(Germany) Winward Racing	Mercedes-AMG GT3 Evo	Mercedes-AMG M159 6.2 L V8	16	Sergey Stolyarov	PA
(Germany) Winward Racing	Mercedes-AMG GT3 Evo	Mercedes-AMG M159 6.2 L V8	16	(Italy) Gabriele Piana	PA
(Germany) Winward Racing	Mercedes-AMG GT3 Evo	Mercedes-AMG M159 6.2 L V8	16	Sergei Borisov	PA
(Germany) Winward Racing	Mercedes-AMG GT3 Evo	Mercedes-AMG M159 6.2 L V8	87	Sergei Borisov	PA
(Germany) Winward Racing	Mercedes-AMG GT3 Evo	Mercedes-AMG M159 6.2 L V8	87	(Italy) Gabriele Piana	PA
(Germany) Winward Racing	Mercedes-AMG GT3 Evo	Mercedes-AMG M159 6.2 L V8	87	Rinat Salikhov	PA
(Germany) Winward Racing	Mercedes-AMG GT3 Evo	Mercedes-AMG M159 6.2 L V8	87	Viktor Shaytar	PA
(Antigua and Barbuda) HAAS RT	Audi R8 LMS Evo II	Audi DAR 5.2 L V10	21	(United Arab Emirates) Alexander Bukhantsov (Note: Bukhantsov and Solukovtsev are Russian but compete under an Emirati licence and under a Kyrgyz license respectively, as Russian national emblems were banned by the FIA following the Russian invasion of Ukraine.)	PA
(Antigua and Barbuda) HAAS RT	Audi R8 LMS Evo II	Audi DAR 5.2 L V10	21	(Canada) Ramez Azzam	PA
(Antigua and Barbuda) HAAS RT	Audi R8 LMS Evo II	Audi DAR 5.2 L V10	21	(United Arab Emirates) Omar Jackson	PA
(Belgium) The Bend Team WRT	BMW M4 GT3 Evo	BMW S58B30T0 3.0 L Turbo V8	32	Timur Boguslavskiy	P
(Belgium) The Bend Team WRT	BMW M4 GT3 Evo	BMW S58B30T0 3.0 L Turbo V8	32	(Australia) Yasser Shahin	P
(Belgium) The Bend Team WRT	BMW M4 GT3 Evo	BMW S58B30T0 3.0 L Turbo V8	32	(Belgium) Charles Weerts	P
(United Kingdom) Optimum Motorsport	McLaren 720S GT3 Evo	McLaren M840T 4.0 L Turbo V8	33	(United Kingdom) Tom Ikin	P
(United Kingdom) Optimum Motorsport	McLaren 720S GT3 Evo	McLaren M840T 4.0 L Turbo V8	33	(United Kingdom) Mikey Porter	P
(United Kingdom) Optimum Motorsport	McLaren 720S GT3 Evo	McLaren M840T 4.0 L Turbo V8	33	(United Kingdom) Andrew Gilbert	P
(United Kingdom) WeBuyAnyPhone.com Racing by Simpson Motorsport (Note: Car No. 38 entered as WeBuyAnyPhone.com Racing by Simpson Motorsport and car No. 69 entered as Continental Racing with Simpson Motorsport) (United Arab Emirates) Continental Racing with Simpson Motorsport	BMW M4 GT3	BMW S58B30T0 3.0 L Turbo V8	38	(United Kingdom) James Kaye	Am
(United Kingdom) WeBuyAnyPhone.com Racing by Simpson Motorsport (United Arab Emirates) Continental Racing with Simpson Motorsport	BMW M4 GT3	BMW S58B30T0 3.0 L Turbo V8	38	(Zimbabwe) Ameerh Naran	Am
(United Kingdom) WeBuyAnyPhone.com Racing by Simpson Motorsport (United Arab Emirates) Continental Racing with Simpson Motorsport	BMW M4 GT3	BMW S58B30T0 3.0 L Turbo V8	38	(United Kingdom) Darren Ridge	Am
(United Kingdom) WeBuyAnyPhone.com Racing by Simpson Motorsport (United Arab Emirates) Continental Racing with Simpson Motorsport	Audi R8 LMS Evo II	Audi DAR 5.2 L V10	69	David Pogosyan	Am
(United Kingdom) WeBuyAnyPhone.com Racing by Simpson Motorsport (United Arab Emirates) Continental Racing with Simpson Motorsport	Audi R8 LMS Evo II	Audi DAR 5.2 L V10	69	(Kyrgyzstan) Andrey Solukovtsev	Am
(United Kingdom) WeBuyAnyPhone.com Racing by Simpson Motorsport (United Arab Emirates) Continental Racing with Simpson Motorsport	Audi R8 LMS Evo II	Audi DAR 5.2 L V10	69	(Cyprus) Vasily Vladykin	Am
(Slovakia) ARC Bratislava	Lamborghini Huracán GT3 Evo	Lamborghini DGF 5.2 L V10	44	(Slovakia) Adam Konôpka	Am
(Slovakia) ARC Bratislava	Lamborghini Huracán GT3 Evo	Lamborghini DGF 5.2 L V10	44	(Slovakia) Miro Konôpka	Am
(Slovakia) ARC Bratislava	Lamborghini Huracán GT3 Evo	Lamborghini DGF 5.2 L V10	44	(Slovakia) Matej Konôpka	Am
(Czech Republic) Scuderia Praha	Ferrari 296 GT3	Ferrari F163 3.0 L Turbo V6	56	(Czech Republic) Josef Král	PA
(Czech Republic) Scuderia Praha	Ferrari 296 GT3	Ferrari F163 3.0 L Turbo V6	56	(Slovakia) Matúš Výboh	PA
(Czech Republic) Scuderia Praha	Ferrari 296 GT3	Ferrari F163 3.0 L Turbo V6	56	(Slovakia) Miroslav Výboh	PA
(United Kingdom) Garage 59	McLaren 720S GT3 Evo	McLaren M840T 4.0 L Turbo V8	58	(United Kingdom) Adam Smalley	P
(United Kingdom) Garage 59	McLaren 720S GT3 Evo	McLaren M840T 4.0 L Turbo V8	58	(Monaco) Louis Prette	P
(United Kingdom) Garage 59	McLaren 720S GT3 Evo	McLaren M840T 4.0 L Turbo V8	58	(China) Zhou Yiran	P
(Germany) Proton Huber Competition	Porsche 911 GT3 R (992)	Porsche M97/80 4.2 L Flat-6	73	(Germany) Jörg Dreisow	Am
(Germany) Proton Huber Competition	Porsche 911 GT3 R (992)	Porsche M97/80 4.2 L Flat-6	73	(Germany) Manuel Lauck	Am
(Germany) Proton Huber Competition	Porsche 911 GT3 R (992)	Porsche M97/80 4.2 L Flat-6	73	(Luxembourg) Gabriel Rindone	Am
(New Zealand) Earl Bamber Motorsport	Aston Martin Vantage AMR GT3 Evo	Aston Martin M177 4.0 L Twin-Turbo V8	77	(Indonesia) Setiawan Santoso	PA
(New Zealand) Earl Bamber Motorsport	Aston Martin Vantage AMR GT3 Evo	Aston Martin M177 4.0 L Twin-Turbo V8	77	(United Kingdom) Jamie Day	PA
(New Zealand) Earl Bamber Motorsport	Aston Martin Vantage AMR GT3 Evo	Aston Martin M177 4.0 L Twin-Turbo V8	77	(Thailand) Tanart Sathienthirakul	PA
(Ukraine) Dinamic GT by Tsunami RT	Porsche 911 GT3 R (992)	Porsche M97/80 4.2 L Flat-6	79	(Italy) Fabio Babini	PA
(Ukraine) Dinamic GT by Tsunami RT	Porsche 911 GT3 R (992)	Porsche M97/80 4.2 L Flat-6	79	(Italy) Giuseppe Ghezzi	PA
(Ukraine) Dinamic GT by Tsunami RT	Porsche 911 GT3 R (992)	Porsche M97/80 4.2 L Flat-6	79	(Germany) Johannes Zelger	PA
(Germany) Herberth Motorsport	Porsche 911 GT3 R (992)	Porsche M97/80 4.2 L Flat-6	80	(Hong Kong) Antares Au	P
(Germany) Herberth Motorsport	Porsche 911 GT3 R (992)	Porsche M97/80 4.2 L Flat-6	80	(Netherlands) Loek Hartog	P
(Germany) Herberth Motorsport	Porsche 911 GT3 R (992)	Porsche M97/80 4.2 L Flat-6	80	(Germany) Joel Sturm	P
(United States) Era Motorsport	Ferrari 296 GT3	Ferrari F163 3.0 L Turbo V6	81	(United Kingdom) Jake Hill	PA
(United States) Era Motorsport	Ferrari 296 GT3	Ferrari F163 3.0 L Turbo V6	81	(United States) Dwight Merriman	PA
(United States) Era Motorsport	Ferrari 296 GT3	Ferrari F163 3.0 L Turbo V6	81	(United States) Kyle Tilley	PA
(Austria) Baron Motorsport	Ferrari 488 GT3 Evo 2020	Ferrari F154CB 3.9 L Turbo V8	86	(Italy) Edoardo Bacci	Am
(Austria) Baron Motorsport	Ferrari 488 GT3 Evo 2020	Ferrari F154CB 3.9 L Turbo V8	86	(Italy) Angelo Nero	Am
(Austria) Baron Motorsport	Ferrari 488 GT3 Evo 2020	Ferrari F154CB 3.9 L Turbo V8	86	(Monaco) Philippe Prette	Am
(Austria) Baron Motorsport	Ferrari 488 GT3 Evo 2020	Ferrari F154CB 3.9 L Turbo V8	86	(Iran) Masoud Jaberian	Am
GWR Australia	Mercedes-AMG GT3 Evo	Mercedes-AMG M159 6.2 L V8	96	(Australia) Brett Hobson	Am
GWR Australia	Mercedes-AMG GT3 Evo	Mercedes-AMG M159 6.2 L V8	96	(Australia) Justin Mcmillan	Am
GWR Australia	Mercedes-AMG GT3 Evo	Mercedes-AMG M159 6.2 L V8	96	(Australia) Michael Sheargold	Am
(Germany) Tresor Attempto Racing	Audi R8 LMS Evo II	Audi DAR 5.2 L V10	99	(Germany) Alex Aka	P
(Germany) Tresor Attempto Racing	Audi R8 LMS Evo II	Audi DAR 5.2 L V10	99	(China) Yi Deng	P
(Germany) Tresor Attempto Racing	Audi R8 LMS Evo II	Audi DAR 5.2 L V10	99	(Belgium) Jef Machiels	P
GTX
(Australia) 111 Racing	IRC GT	GM LS3 6.2 L V8	111	(Australia) Jake Camilleri	
(Australia) 111 Racing	IRC GT	GM LS3 6.2 L V8	111	(Australia) Darren Currie	
(Australia) 111 Racing	IRC GT	GM LS3 6.2 L V8	111	(Australia) Grant Donaldson	
(France) Vortex V8	Vortex 2.0	Chevrolet LS3 6.2 L V8	701	(France) Lionel Amrouche	
(France) Vortex V8	Vortex 2.0	Chevrolet LS3 6.2 L V8	701	(France) Philippe Bonnel	
(France) Vortex V8	Vortex 2.0	Chevrolet LS3 6.2 L V8	701	(France) Gilles Courtois	
(France) Vortex V8	Vortex 2.0	Chevrolet LS3 6.2 L V8	702	(France) Arnaud Gomez	
(France) Vortex V8	Vortex 2.0	Chevrolet LS3 6.2 L V8	702	(France) Olivier Gomez	
(United Arab Emirates) Saalocin by Kox Racing	KTM X-Bow GT2	Audi 2.5 L I5	748	(Netherlands) Peter Kox	
(United Arab Emirates) Saalocin by Kox Racing	KTM X-Bow GT2	Audi 2.5 L I5	748	(Netherlands) Nico Pronk	
(United Arab Emirates) Saalocin by Kox Racing	KTM X-Bow GT2	Audi 2.5 L I5	748	(Netherlands) Dennis Retera	
(United Kingdom) Scott Sport	Lamborghini Huracán Super Trofeo Evo	Lamborghini 5.2 L V10	750	(Canada) Keith Frieser	
(United Kingdom) Scott Sport	Lamborghini Huracán Super Trofeo Evo	Lamborghini 5.2 L V10	750	(Denmark) Mikkel Mac	
(United Kingdom) Scott Sport	Lamborghini Huracán Super Trofeo Evo	Lamborghini 5.2 L V10	750	(United Kingdom) Aaron Scott	
992
(France) SebLajoux Racing	Porsche 992 GT3 Cup	Porsche 4.0 L Flat-6	888	(France) Stephane Perrin	Am
(France) SebLajoux Racing	Porsche 992 GT3 Cup	Porsche 4.0 L Flat-6	888	(France) Sebastien Lajoux	Am
(France) SebLajoux Racing	Porsche 992 GT3 Cup	Porsche 4.0 L Flat-6	888	(Hong Kong) Liu Kaishun	Am
(France) SebLajoux Racing	Porsche 992 GT3 Cup	Porsche 4.0 L Flat-6	888	(Netherlands) Paul Meijer	Am
(France) SebLajoux Racing	Porsche 992 GT3 Cup	Porsche 4.0 L Flat-6	992	(China) Ling Kang	P
(France) SebLajoux Racing	Porsche 992 GT3 Cup	Porsche 4.0 L Flat-6	992	(China) Lu Zhiwei	P
(France) SebLajoux Racing	Porsche 992 GT3 Cup	Porsche 4.0 L Flat-6	992	(China) Cao QiKuan	P
(Netherlands) Red Camel-Jordans.nl	Porsche 992 GT3 Cup	Porsche 4.0 L Flat-6	909	(Netherlands) Ivo Breukers	P
(Netherlands) Red Camel-Jordans.nl	Porsche 992 GT3 Cup	Porsche 4.0 L Flat-6	909	(Netherlands) Luc Breukers	P
(Netherlands) Red Camel-Jordans.nl	Porsche 992 GT3 Cup	Porsche 4.0 L Flat-6	909	(Netherlands) Rik Breukers	P
(Netherlands) Red Camel-Jordans.nl	Porsche 992 GT3 Cup	Porsche 4.0 L Flat-6	909	(Switzerland) Fabian Danz	P
(France) TFT Racing	Porsche 992 GT3 Cup	Porsche 4.0 L Flat-6	911	(France) Jordan Boisson	Am
(France) TFT Racing	Porsche 992 GT3 Cup	Porsche 4.0 L Flat-6	911	(France) Patrick Charlaix	Am
(France) TFT Racing	Porsche 992 GT3 Cup	Porsche 4.0 L Flat-6	911	(Belgium) Benjamin Paque	Am
(Austria) Razoon – More Than Racing	Porsche 992 GT3 Cup	Porsche 4.0 L Flat-6	914	(Denmark) Simon Birch	P
(Austria) Razoon – More Than Racing	Porsche 992 GT3 Cup	Porsche 4.0 L Flat-6	914	(Poland) Artur Chwist	P
(Austria) Razoon – More Than Racing	Porsche 992 GT3 Cup	Porsche 4.0 L Flat-6	914	(Austria) Daniel Drexel	P
(Italy) Fulgenzi Racing	Porsche 992 GT3 Cup	Porsche 4.0 L Flat-6	917	(Italy) Enrico Fulgenzi	Am
(Italy) Fulgenzi Racing	Porsche 992 GT3 Cup	Porsche 4.0 L Flat-6	917	(United Arab Emirates) Alessandro Giannone	Am
(Italy) Fulgenzi Racing	Porsche 992 GT3 Cup	Porsche 4.0 L Flat-6	917	(Italy) Andrea Girondi	Am
(United Arab Emirates) RABDAN by Fulgenzi Racing	Porsche 992 GT3 Cup	Porsche 4.0 L Flat-6	971	(United Arab Emirates) Saif Alameri	Am
(United Arab Emirates) RABDAN by Fulgenzi Racing	Porsche 992 GT3 Cup	Porsche 4.0 L Flat-6	971	(United Arab Emirates) Salem Alketbi	Am
(United Arab Emirates) RABDAN by Fulgenzi Racing	Porsche 992 GT3 Cup	Porsche 4.0 L Flat-6	971	(Austria) Christopher Zöchling	Am
(Belgium) Mühlner Motorsport	Porsche 992 GT3 Cup	Porsche 4.0 L Flat-6	918	(Estonia) Martin Rump	P
(Belgium) Mühlner Motorsport	Porsche 992 GT3 Cup	Porsche 4.0 L Flat-6	918	(Latvia) Valters Zviedris	P
(Germany) HRT Performance	Porsche 992 GT3 Cup	Porsche 4.0 L Flat-6	928	Alexey Denisov	Am
(Germany) HRT Performance	Porsche 992 GT3 Cup	Porsche 4.0 L Flat-6	928	Sergey Titarenko	Am
(Germany) HRT Performance	Porsche 992 GT3 Cup	Porsche 4.0 L Flat-6	928	Victor Titarenko	Am
(Germany) HRT Performance	Porsche 992 GT3 Cup	Porsche 4.0 L Flat-6	929	(Qatar) Jassim Al-Thani	Am
(Germany) HRT Performance	Porsche 992 GT3 Cup	Porsche 4.0 L Flat-6	929	(Qatar) Ahmed Al-emadi	Am
(Germany) HRT Performance	Porsche 992 GT3 Cup	Porsche 4.0 L Flat-6	929	(Belgium) Gilles Thiers	Am
(Germany) HRT Performance	Porsche 992 GT3 Cup	Porsche 4.0 L Flat-6	930	(United States) Gregg Gorski	Am
(Germany) HRT Performance	Porsche 992 GT3 Cup	Porsche 4.0 L Flat-6	930	(Germany) Alex Renner	Am
(Germany) HRT Performance	Porsche 992 GT3 Cup	Porsche 4.0 L Flat-6	930	(United Kingdom) Jonathan Simmonds	Am
(Qatar) QMMF by HRT	Porsche 992 GT3 Cup	Porsche 4.0 L Flat-6	974	(Qatar) Ibrahim Al-Abdulghani	Am
(Qatar) QMMF by HRT	Porsche 992 GT3 Cup	Porsche 4.0 L Flat-6	974	(Qatar) Abdulla Ali Al-Khelaifi	Am
(Qatar) QMMF by HRT	Porsche 992 GT3 Cup	Porsche 4.0 L Flat-6	974	(Qatar) Ghanim Al-Maadheed	Am
(Qatar) QMMF by HRT	Porsche 992 GT3 Cup	Porsche 4.0 L Flat-6	974	(Germany) Julian Hanses	Am
(Belgium) Speed Lover	Porsche 992 GT3 Cup	Porsche 4.0 L Flat-6	978	(Belgium) Wim Meulders	Am
(Belgium) Speed Lover	Porsche 992 GT3 Cup	Porsche 4.0 L Flat-6	978	(Belgium) Gilles Renmans	Am
(Belgium) Speed Lover	Porsche 992 GT3 Cup	Porsche 4.0 L Flat-6	978	(Belgium) Rik Renmans	Am
(United Kingdom) Toro Verde GT	Porsche 992 GT3 Cup	Porsche 4.0 L Flat-6	995	(United Kingdom) Graeme Mundy	Am
(United Kingdom) Toro Verde GT	Porsche 992 GT3 Cup	Porsche 4.0 L Flat-6	995	(United Kingdom) Steve Laidlaw	Am
(United Kingdom) Toro Verde GT	Porsche 992 GT3 Cup	Porsche 4.0 L Flat-6	995	(United Kingdom) Callum Davis	Am
GT4
(Germany) SRS Team Sorg Rennsport	Porsche 718 Cayman GT4 RS Clubsport	Porsche MDG 4.0 L Flat-6	427	(Ukraine) Oleksiy Kikireshko	
(Germany) SRS Team Sorg Rennsport	Porsche 718 Cayman GT4 RS Clubsport	Porsche MDG 4.0 L Flat-6	427	(Germany) Jan-Niklas Stieler	
(Germany) SRS Team Sorg Rennsport	Porsche 718 Cayman GT4 RS Clubsport	Porsche MDG 4.0 L Flat-6	427	(United States) Arthur Simondet	
(United Kingdom) Simpson Motorsport	BMW M4 GT4 Gen II	BMW S58B30T0 3.0 L Twin Turbo I6	438	(Japan) Takashi Hata	
(United Kingdom) Simpson Motorsport	BMW M4 GT4 Gen II	BMW S58B30T0 3.0 L Twin Turbo I6	438	(Japan) Taiyo Ida	
(United Kingdom) Simpson Motorsport	BMW M4 GT4 Gen II	BMW S58B30T0 3.0 L Twin Turbo I6	438	(Japan) Kenji Suzuki	
(Germany) WS Racing	BMW M4 GT4 Gen II	BMW S58B30T0 3.0 L Twin Turbo I6	470	(Netherlands) Jeroen Bleekemolen	
(Germany) WS Racing	BMW M4 GT4 Gen II	BMW S58B30T0 3.0 L Twin Turbo I6	470	(United States) Keith Gatehouse	
(Germany) WS Racing	BMW M4 GT4 Gen II	BMW S58B30T0 3.0 L Twin Turbo I6	470	(Romania) Tudor Tudurachi	
(United Arab Emirates) Continental TTR Racing	Toyota GR Supra GT4 Evo	BMW B58B30 3.0 L Twin-Turbo I6	496	Stanislav Nonikov	
(United Arab Emirates) Continental TTR Racing	Toyota GR Supra GT4 Evo	BMW B58B30 3.0 L Twin-Turbo I6	496	Ilya Sidorov	
(United Arab Emirates) Continental TTR Racing	Toyota GR Supra GT4 Evo	BMW B58B30 3.0 L Twin-Turbo I6	496	(Australia) Cameron Mcleod	
TCX
(Germany) AsBest Racing	SEAT León Cup Racer	Volkswagen EA888 2.0 L I4	102	(United Arab Emirates) Ahmed Al Khaja	
(Germany) AsBest Racing	SEAT León Cup Racer	Volkswagen EA888 2.0 L I4	102	(India) Fahad Nasir Khan	
(Germany) AsBest Racing	SEAT León Cup Racer	Volkswagen EA888 2.0 L I4	102	(United Arab Emirates) Johny Khazzoum	
(France) Chazel Technologie Course	Alpine A110 Cup	Alpine Renault TCe M5Pt 1.8 L Turbo I4	110	(France) Michel Abattu	
(France) Chazel Technologie Course	Alpine A110 Cup	Alpine Renault TCe M5Pt 1.8 L Turbo I4	110	(France) Felix Crepet	
(France) Chazel Technologie Course	Alpine A110 Cup	Alpine Renault TCe M5Pt 1.8 L Turbo I4	110	(France) Stephane Lipp	
(France) Chazel Technologie Course	Alpine A110 Cup	Alpine Renault TCe M5Pt 1.8 L Turbo I4	110	(France) Guillaume Masset	
(France) Chazel Technologie Course	Alpine A110 Cup	Alpine Renault TCe M5Pt 1.8 L Turbo I4	193	(France) Frederic de Brabant	
(France) Chazel Technologie Course	Alpine A110 Cup	Alpine Renault TCe M5Pt 1.8 L Turbo I4	193	(France) Louka Desgranges	
(France) Chazel Technologie Course	Alpine A110 Cup	Alpine Renault TCe M5Pt 1.8 L Turbo I4	193	(Russia) Ivan Ovsienko	

GT3 entries
Icon	Class
P	GT3-Pro
PA	GT3-Pro Am
Am	GT3-Am
992 entries
Icon	Class
P	992-Pro
Am	992-Am

== Free Practice ==
Class	No.	Entrant	Driver	Time
GT3	16	(Germany) Winward Racing	(Italy) Gabriele Piana	1:52.693
GTX	750	(United Kingdom) Scott Sport	(Denmark) Mikkel Mac	1:54.051
992	914	(Austria) Razoon – More Than Racing	(Denmark) Simon Birch	1:56.585
GT4	470	(Germany) WS Racing	(Netherlands) Jeroen Bleekemolen	2:03.504
TCE	193	(France) Chazel Technologie Course	(Russia) Ivan Ovsienko	2:09.151

- Note: Only the fastest car in each class is shown.

== Qualifying ==
=== Qualifying results ===
Pole position winners in each class are marked in bold.

Pos.	Class	No.	Team	Avg
1	**GT3 Pro/Am**	**87**	**(Germany) Winward Racing**	**1:52.648**
2	**GT3 Pro**	**7**	**(Germany) SMP Racing**	**1:53.195**
3	GT3 Pro/Am	8	(South Africa) Into Africa Racing by Dragon Racing	1:53.308
4	GT3 Pro	33	(United Kingdom) Optimum Motorsport	1:53.448
5	GT3 Pro	99	(Germany) Tresor Attempto Racing	1:53.541
6	GT3 Pro/Am	16	(Germany) Winward Racing	1:53.606
7	**GT3 Am**	**2**	**(China) Climax Racing**	**1:53.764**
8	GT3 Pro	32	(Belgium) The Bend Team WRT	1:53.933
9	GT3 Pro	58	(United Kingdom) Garage 59	1:53.978
10	GT3 Pro	80	(Germany) Herberth Motorsport	1:54.053
11	GT3 Pro	5	(Germany) Team Motopark	1:54.149
12	GT3 Pro/Am	1	(United Arab Emirates) Manamauri Energy by Ebimotors	1:54.434
13	GT3 Pro/Am	4	(Germany) Haupt Racing Team	1:54.470
14	GT3 Am	69	(United Arab Emirates) Continental Racing with Simpson Motorsport	1:54.574
15	GT3 Am	86	(Austria) Baron Motorsport	1:54.982
16	GT3 Am	77	(New Zealand) Earl Bamber Motorsport	1:55.043
17	GT3 Pro/Am	21	(Antigua and Barbuda) HAAS RT	1:55.622
18	GT3 Am	73	(Germany) Proton Huber Competition	1:55.798
19	GT3 Pro/Am	98	(United Arab Emirates) Dragon Racing	1:55.900
20	GT3 Pro/Am	79	(Ukraine) Dinamic GT by Tsunami RT	1:56.014
21	GT3 Am	11	(Switzerland) Hofor Racing	1:56.096
22	GT3 Pro/Am	81	(United States) Era Motorsport	1:56.163
23	**GTX**	**750**	**(United Kingdom) Scott Sport**	**1:56.344**
24	GT3 Am	96	GWR Australia	1:56.347
25	GT3 Am	44	(Slovakia) ARC Bratislava	1:56.376
26	**992 Pro**	**909**	**(Netherlands) Red Camel-Jordans.nl**	**1:56.939**
27	GT3 Pro/Am	56	(Czech Republic) Scuderia Praha	1:57.406
28	992 Pro	918	(Belgium) Mühlner Motorsport	1: 57.426
29	**992 Am**	**974**	**(Qatar) QMMF by HRT**	**1:57.845**
30	992 Am	888	(France) SebLajoux Racing	1:58.052
31	992 Am	971	(United Arab Emirates) RABDAN by Fulgenzi Racing	1:58.232
32	992 Am	917	(Italy) Fulgenzi Racing	1:58.283
33	992 Pro	914	(Austria) Razoon – More Than Racing	1:58.705
34	GTX	748	(United Arab Emirates) Saalocin by Kox Racing	1:58.951
35	992 Am	911	(France) TFT Racing	1:59.057
36	992 Am	928	(Germany) HRT Performance	1:59.650
37	GT3 Am	38	(United Kingdom) WeBuyAnyPhone.com Racing by Simpson Motorsport	2:00.498
38	GTX	111	(Australia) 111 Racing	2:00.562
39	992 Am	992	(France) SebLajoux Racing	2:00.726
40	992 Am	978	(Belgium) Speed Lover	2:01.054
41	992 Am	930	(Germany) HRT Performance	2:01.518
42	992 Am	929	(Germany) HRT Performance	2:02.085
43	GTX	701	(France) Vortex V8	2:02.500
44	**GT4**	**496**	**(United Arab Emirates) Continental TTR Racing**	**2:03.226**
45	GT4	470	(Germany) WS Racing	2:05.776
46	GT4	438	(United Kingdom) Simpson Motorsport	2:07.461
47	GT4	427	(Germany) SRS Team Sorg Rennsport	2:07.529
48	**TCE**	**193**	**(France) Chazel Technologie Course**	**2:09.885**
49	TCE	102	(Germany) AsBest Racing	2:11.478
50	TCE	110	(France) Chazel Technologie Course	2:11.770
51	GTX	702	(France) Vortex V8	—
52	992 Am	995	(United Kingdom) Toro Verde GT	—

== Race ==
=== Race results ===
Class winners in bold.

Pos	Class	No.	Team	Drivers	Chassis	Time/Reason	Laps
Pos	Class	No.	Team	Drivers	Engine	Time/Reason	Laps
1	**GT3 Pro**	**32**	**(Belgium) The Bend Team WRT**	**Timur Boguslavskiy** **(Australia) Yasser Shahin** **(Belgium) Charles Weerts**	**BMW M4 GT3 Evo**	**6:01:39.284**	**160**
1	**GT3 Pro**	**32**	**(Belgium) The Bend Team WRT**	**Timur Boguslavskiy** **(Australia) Yasser Shahin** **(Belgium) Charles Weerts**	**BMW S58B30T0 3.0 L Turbo V8**	**6:01:39.284**	**160**
2	**GT3 Pro/Am**	**16**	**(Germany) Winward Racing**	**(Italy) Gabriele Piana**; **Sergei Borisov**; **Viktor Shaytar**; **Sergey Stolyarov**	**Mercedes-AMG GT3 Evo**	**+12.111**	**160**
2	**GT3 Pro/Am**	**16**	**(Germany) Winward Racing**	**(Italy) Gabriele Piana**; **Sergei Borisov**; **Viktor Shaytar**; **Sergey Stolyarov**	**Mercedes-AMG M159 6.2 L V8**	**+12.111**	**160**
3	GT3 Pro	33	(United Kingdom) Optimum Motorsport	(United Kingdom) Tom Ikin (United Kingdom) Mikey Porter (United Kingdom) Andrew Gilbert	McLaren 720S GT3 Evo	+1:05.587	160
3	GT3 Pro	33	(United Kingdom) Optimum Motorsport	(United Kingdom) Tom Ikin (United Kingdom) Mikey Porter (United Kingdom) Andrew Gilbert	McLaren M840T 4.0 L Turbo V8	+1:05.587	160
4	GT3 Pro	5	(Germany) Team Motopark	(Netherlands) Nigel Schoonderwoerd (Hungary) Levente Révész (Netherlands) Yelmer Buurman	Mercedes-AMG GT3 Evo	+1:07.741	160
4	GT3 Pro	5	(Germany) Team Motopark	(Netherlands) Nigel Schoonderwoerd (Hungary) Levente Révész (Netherlands) Yelmer Buurman	Mercedes-AMG M159 6.2 L V8	+1:07.741	160
5	**GT3 Am**	**11**	**(Switzerland) Hofor Racing**	**(Switzerland) Michael Kroll** **(Germany) Alexander Prinz** **(Switzerland) Chantal Prinz** **(Germany) Timo Rumpfkeil**	**Mercedes-AMG GT3**	**+1:54.293**	**160**
5	**GT3 Am**	**11**	**(Switzerland) Hofor Racing**	**(Switzerland) Michael Kroll** **(Germany) Alexander Prinz** **(Switzerland) Chantal Prinz** **(Germany) Timo Rumpfkeil**	**Mercedes-AMG M159 6.2 L V8**	**+1:54.293**	**160**
6 DNF	GT3 Pro	80	(Germany) Herberth Motorsport	(Hong Kong) Antares Au (Netherlands) Loek Hartog (Germany) Joel Sturm	Porsche 911 GT3 R (992)	Collision damage	159
6 DNF	GT3 Pro	80	(Germany) Herberth Motorsport	(Hong Kong) Antares Au (Netherlands) Loek Hartog (Germany) Joel Sturm	Porsche M97/80 4.2 L Flat-6	Collision damage	159
7	GT3 Pro/Am	87	(Germany) Winward Racing	(Italy) Gabriele Piana; Sergei Borisov; Rinat Salikhov; Sergey Stolyarov	Mercedes-AMG GT3 Evo	+1 Lap	159
7	GT3 Pro/Am	87	(Germany) Winward Racing	(Italy) Gabriele Piana; Sergei Borisov; Rinat Salikhov; Sergey Stolyarov	Mercedes-AMG M159 6.2 L V8	+1 Lap	159
8	GT3 Pro	99	(Germany) Tresor Attempto Racing	(Germany) Alex Aka (China) Yi Deng (Belgium) Jef Machiels	Audi R8 LMS Evo II	+1 Lap	159
8	GT3 Pro	99	(Germany) Tresor Attempto Racing	(Germany) Alex Aka (China) Yi Deng (Belgium) Jef Machiels	Audi DAR 5.2 L V10	+1 Lap	159
9	GT3 Pro/Am	1	(United Arab Emirates) Manamauri Energy by Ebimotors	(Italy) Fabrizio Broggi (Italy) Sabino de Castro (Romania) Sergiu Nicolae (Italy) Cosimo Papi	Porsche 911 GT3 R (992)	+1 Lap	159
9	GT3 Pro/Am	1	(United Arab Emirates) Manamauri Energy by Ebimotors	(Italy) Fabrizio Broggi (Italy) Sabino de Castro (Romania) Sergiu Nicolae (Italy) Cosimo Papi	Porsche M97/80 4.2 L Flat-6	+1 Lap	159
10	GT3 Pro/Am	8	(South Africa) Into Africa Racing by Dragon Racing	(United States) Blake McDonald (South Africa) Stuart White (Zimbabwe) Axcil Jefferies (South Africa) Xollie Letlaka	Ferrari 296 GT3	+1 Lap	159
10	GT3 Pro/Am	8	(South Africa) Into Africa Racing by Dragon Racing	(United States) Blake McDonald (South Africa) Stuart White (Zimbabwe) Axcil Jefferies (South Africa) Xollie Letlaka	Ferrari F163 3.0 L Turbo V6	+1 Lap	159
11	GT3 Pro	58	(United Kingdom) Garage 59	(United Kingdom) Adam Smalley (Monaco) Louis Prette (China) Zhou Yiran	McLaren 720S GT3 Evo	+1 Lap	159
11	GT3 Pro	58	(United Kingdom) Garage 59	(United Kingdom) Adam Smalley (Monaco) Louis Prette (China) Zhou Yiran	McLaren M840T 4.0 L Turbo V8	+1 Lap	159
12	GT3 Pro/Am	21	(Antigua and Barbuda) HAAS RT	(United Arab Emirates) Alexander Bukhantsov (Canada) Ramez Azzam (United Arab Emirates) Omar Jackson	Audi R8 LMS Evo II	+2 Laps	158
12	GT3 Pro/Am	21	(Antigua and Barbuda) HAAS RT	(United Arab Emirates) Alexander Bukhantsov (Canada) Ramez Azzam (United Arab Emirates) Omar Jackson	Audi DAR 5.2 L V10	+2 Laps	158
13	GT3 Pro/Am	4	(Germany) Haupt Racing Team	(Germany) Finn Wiebelhaus (Saudi Arabia) Reema Juffali (Germany) Salman Owega	Mercedes-AMG GT3 Evo	+2 Laps	158
13	GT3 Pro/Am	4	(Germany) Haupt Racing Team	(Germany) Finn Wiebelhaus (Saudi Arabia) Reema Juffali (Germany) Salman Owega	Mercedes-AMG M159 6.2 L V8	+2 Laps	158
14	GT3 Pro	7	(Germany) SMP Racing	Vitaly Petrov; Dennis Remenyako; Sergey Sirotkin; Alexander Smolyar	Mercedes-AMG GT3 Evo	+2 Laps	158
14	GT3 Pro	7	(Germany) SMP Racing	Vitaly Petrov; Dennis Remenyako; Sergey Sirotkin; Alexander Smolyar	Mercedes-AMG M159 6.2 L V8	+2 Laps	158
15	GT3 Am	69	(United Arab Emirates) Continental Racing with Simpson Motorsport	David Pogosyan (Kyrgyzstan) Andrey Solukovtsev (Cyprus) Vasily Vladykin	Audi R8 LMS Evo II	+2 Laps	158
15	GT3 Am	69	(United Arab Emirates) Continental Racing with Simpson Motorsport	David Pogosyan (Kyrgyzstan) Andrey Solukovtsev (Cyprus) Vasily Vladykin	Audi DAR 5.2 L V10	+2 Laps	158
16	GT3 Am	73	(Germany) Proton Huber Competition	(Germany) Jörg Dreisow (Germany) Manuel Lauck (Luxembourg) Gabriel Rindone	Porsche 911 GT3 R (992)	+3 Laps	157
16	GT3 Am	73	(Germany) Proton Huber Competition	(Germany) Jörg Dreisow (Germany) Manuel Lauck (Luxembourg) Gabriel Rindone	Porsche M97/80 4.2 L Flat-6	+3 Laps	157
17	**992 Pro**	**918**	**(Belgium) Mühlner Motorsport**	**(Estonia) Martin Rump** **(Latvia) Valters Zviedris**	**Porsche 992 GT3 Cup**	**+3 Laps**	**157**
17	**992 Pro**	**918**	**(Belgium) Mühlner Motorsport**	**(Estonia) Martin Rump** **(Latvia) Valters Zviedris**	**Porsche 4.0 L Flat-6**	**+3 Laps**	**157**
18	**992 Am**	**974**	**(Qatar) QMMF by HRT**	**(Qatar) Ibrahim Al-Abdulghani** **(Qatar) Abdulla Ali Al-Khelaifi** **(Qatar) Ghanim Al-Maadheed** **(Germany) Julian Hanses**	**Porsche 992 GT3 Cup**	**+3 Laps**	**157**
18	**992 Am**	**974**	**(Qatar) QMMF by HRT**	**(Qatar) Ibrahim Al-Abdulghani** **(Qatar) Abdulla Ali Al-Khelaifi** **(Qatar) Ghanim Al-Maadheed** **(Germany) Julian Hanses**	**Porsche 4.0 L Flat-6**	**+3 Laps**	**157**
19	GT3 Pro/Am	98	(United Arab Emirates) Dragon Racing	(United Kingdom) Glynn Geddie (United Kingdom) Jim Geddie (United Kingdom) Phil Keen	Porsche 911 GT3 R (991.2)	+3 Laps	157
19	GT3 Pro/Am	98	(United Arab Emirates) Dragon Racing	(United Kingdom) Glynn Geddie (United Kingdom) Jim Geddie (United Kingdom) Phil Keen	Porsche 4.0 L Flat-6	+3 Laps	157
20	GT3 Pro/Am	56	(Czech Republic) Scuderia Praha	(Czech Republic) Josef Král (Slovakia) Matúš Výboh (Slovakia) Miroslav Výboh	Ferrari 296 GT3	+3 Laps	157
20	GT3 Pro/Am	56	(Czech Republic) Scuderia Praha	(Czech Republic) Josef Král (Slovakia) Matúš Výboh (Slovakia) Miroslav Výboh	Ferrari F163 3.0 L Turbo V6	+3 Laps	157
21	GT3 Pro/Am	77	(Australia) Earl Bamber Motorsport	(Indonesia) Setiawan Santoso (United Kingdom) Jamie Day (Thailand) Tanart Sathienthirakul	Aston Martin Vantage AMR GT3 Evo	+4 Laps	156
21	GT3 Pro/Am	77	(Australia) Earl Bamber Motorsport	(Indonesia) Setiawan Santoso (United Kingdom) Jamie Day (Thailand) Tanart Sathienthirakul	Aston Martin M177 4.0 L Twin-Turbo V8	+4 Laps	156
22	GT3 Pro/Am	79	(Ukraine) Dinamic GT by Tsunami RT	(Italy) Fabio Babini (Italy) Giuseppe Ghezzi (Germany) Johannes Zelger	Porsche 911 GT3 R (992)	+5 Laps	155
22	GT3 Pro/Am	79	(Ukraine) Dinamic GT by Tsunami RT	(Italy) Fabio Babini (Italy) Giuseppe Ghezzi (Germany) Johannes Zelger	Porsche M97/80 4.2 L Flat-6	+5 Laps	155
23	992 Pro	914	(Austria) Razoon – More Than Racing	(Poland) Artur Chwist (Denmark) Simon Birch (Austria) Daniel Drexel	Porsche 992 GT3 Cup	+5 Laps	155
23	992 Pro	914	(Austria) Razoon – More Than Racing	(Poland) Artur Chwist (Denmark) Simon Birch (Austria) Daniel Drexel	Porsche 4.0 L Flat-6	+5 Laps	155
24	992 Am	917	(Italy) Fulgenzi Racing	(Italy) Enrico Fulgenzi (United Arab Emirates) Alessandro Giannone (Italy) Andrea Girondi	Porsche 992 GT3 Cup	+5 Laps	155
24	992 Am	917	(Italy) Fulgenzi Racing	(Italy) Enrico Fulgenzi (United Arab Emirates) Alessandro Giannone (Italy) Andrea Girondi	Porsche 4.0 L Flat-6	+5 Laps	155
25	GT3 Pro/Am	81	(United States) Era Motorsport	(United Kingdom) Jake Hill (United States) Dwight Merriman (United States) Kyle Tilley	Ferrari 296 GT3	+7 Laps	153
25	GT3 Pro/Am	81	(United States) Era Motorsport	(United Kingdom) Jake Hill (United States) Dwight Merriman (United States) Kyle Tilley	Ferrari F163 3.0 L Turbo V6	+7 Laps	153
26	992 Am	928	(Germany) HRT Performance	Alexey Denisov; Sergey Titarenko; Victor Titarenko	Porsche 992 GT3 Cup	+7 Laps	153
26	992 Am	928	(Germany) HRT Performance	Alexey Denisov; Sergey Titarenko; Victor Titarenko	Porsche 4.0 L Flat-6	+7 Laps	153
27	992 Am	888	(France) SebLajoux Racing	(France) Stephane Perrin (France) Sebastien Lajoux (Hong Kong) Liu Kaishun (Netherlands) Paul Meijer	Porsche 992 GT3 Cup	+7 Laps	153
27	992 Am	888	(France) SebLajoux Racing	(France) Stephane Perrin (France) Sebastien Lajoux (Hong Kong) Liu Kaishun (Netherlands) Paul Meijer	Porsche 4.0 L Flat-6	+7 Laps	153
28	**GTX**	**748**	**(United Arab Emirates) Saalocin by Kox Racing**	**(Netherlands) Peter Kox** **(Netherlands) Nico Pronk** **(Netherlands) Dennis Retera**	**KTM X-Bow GT2**	**+8 Laps**	**152**
28	**GTX**	**748**	**(United Arab Emirates) Saalocin by Kox Racing**	**(Netherlands) Peter Kox** **(Netherlands) Nico Pronk** **(Netherlands) Dennis Retera**	**Audi 2.5 L I5**	**+8 Laps**	**152**
29	992 Am	978	(Belgium) Speed Lover	(Belgium) Wim Meulders (Belgium) Gilles Renmans (Belgium) Rik Renmans	Porsche 992 GT3 Cup	+8 Laps	152
29	992 Am	978	(Belgium) Speed Lover	(Belgium) Wim Meulders (Belgium) Gilles Renmans (Belgium) Rik Renmans	Porsche 4.0 L Flat-6	+8 Laps	152
30	992 Am	992	(France) SebLajoux Rac ing by Climax	(China) Ling Kang (China) Lu Zhiwei (China) Cao QiKuan	Porsche 992 GT3 Cup	+8 Laps	152
30	992 Am	992	(France) SebLajoux Rac ing by Climax	(China) Ling Kang (China) Lu Zhiwei (China) Cao QiKuan	Porsche 4.0 L Flat-6	+8 Laps	152
31 DNF	GT3 Am	44	(Slovakia) ARC Bratislava	(Slovakia) Adam Konôpka (Slovakia) Miro Konôpka (Slovakia) Matej Konôpka	Lamborghini Huracán GT3 Evo	+9 Laps	151
31 DNF	GT3 Am	44	(Slovakia) ARC Bratislava	(Slovakia) Adam Konôpka (Slovakia) Miro Konôpka (Slovakia) Matej Konôpka	Lamborghini DGF 5.2 L V10	+9 Laps	151
32	GT3 Am	38	(United Kingdom) WeBuyAnyPhone.com Racing by Simpson Motorsport	(United Kingdom) James Kaye (Zimbabwe) Ameerh Naran (United Kingdom) Darren Ridge	BMW M4 GT3	+11 Laps	149
32	GT3 Am	38	(United Kingdom) WeBuyAnyPhone.com Racing by Simpson Motorsport	(United Kingdom) James Kaye (Zimbabwe) Ameerh Naran (United Kingdom) Darren Ridge	BMW S58B30T0 3.0 L Turbo V8	+11 Laps	149
33	992 Am	930	(Germany) HRT Performance	(United States) Gregg Gorski (Germany) Alex Renner (United Kingdom) Jonathan Simmonds	Porsche 992 GT3 Cup	+11 Laps	149
33	992 Am	930	(Germany) HRT Performance	(United States) Gregg Gorski (Germany) Alex Renner (United Kingdom) Jonathan Simmonds	Porsche 4.0 L Flat-6	+11 Laps	149
34	GT3 Am	2	(China) Climax Racing	(China) Lu Wei (China) Zhang Yaqi (China) Mike Zhou	Mercedes-AMG GT3 Evo	+12 Laps	148
34	GT3 Am	2	(China) Climax Racing	(China) Lu Wei (China) Zhang Yaqi (China) Mike Zhou	Mercedes-AMG M159 6.2 L V8	+12 Laps	148
35 DNF	GTX	111	(Australia) 111 Racing	(Australia) Jake Camilleri (Australia) Darren Currie (Australia) Grant Donaldson	IRC GT	Suspension arm	146
35 DNF	GTX	111	(Australia) 111 Racing	(Australia) Jake Camilleri (Australia) Darren Currie (Australia) Grant Donaldson	GM LS3 6.2 L V8	Suspension arm	146
36	**GT4**	**438**	**(United Kingdom) AGMC Racing by Simpson Motorsport**	**(Japan) Takashi Hata** **(Japan) Taiyo Ida** **(Japan) Kenji Suzuki**	**BMW M4 GT4 Gen II**	**+16 Laps**	**144**
36	**GT4**	**438**	**(United Kingdom) AGMC Racing by Simpson Motorsport**	**(Japan) Takashi Hata** **(Japan) Taiyo Ida** **(Japan) Kenji Suzuki**	**BMW S58B30T0 3.0 L Twin Turbo I6**	**+16 Laps**	**144**
37	992 Am	929	(Germany) HRT Performance	(Qatar) Jassim Al-Thani (Qatar) Ahmed Al-emadi (Belgium) Gilles Thiers	Porsche 992 GT3 Cup	+18 Laps	142
37	992 Am	929	(Germany) HRT Performance	(Qatar) Jassim Al-Thani (Qatar) Ahmed Al-emadi (Belgium) Gilles Thiers	Porsche 4.0 L Flat-6	+18 Laps	142
38	GT3 Am	86	(Austria) Baron Motorsport	(Italy) Edoardo Bacci (Italy) Angelo Nero (Monaco) Philippe Prette (Iran) Masoud Jaberian	Ferrari 488 GT3 Evo 2020	+21 Laps	139
38	GT3 Am	86	(Austria) Baron Motorsport	(Italy) Edoardo Bacci (Italy) Angelo Nero (Monaco) Philippe Prette (Iran) Masoud Jaberian	Ferrari F154CB 3.9 L Turbo V8	+21 Laps	139
39	GT4	470	(Germany) WS Racing	(Netherlands) Jeroen Bleekemolen (Romania) Tudor Tudurachi (United States) Keith Gatehouse	BMW M4 GT4 Gen II	+21 Laps	139
39	GT4	470	(Germany) WS Racing	(Netherlands) Jeroen Bleekemolen (Romania) Tudor Tudurachi (United States) Keith Gatehouse	BMW S58B30T0 3.0 L Twin Turbo I6	+21 Laps	139
40	992 Pro	909	(Netherlands) Red Camel-Jordans.nl	(Netherlands) Ivo Breukers (Netherlands) Luc Breukers (Netherlands) Rik Breukers (Switzerland) Fabian Danz	Porsche 992 GT3 Cup	+25 Laps	135
40	992 Pro	909	(Netherlands) Red Camel-Jordans.nl	(Netherlands) Ivo Breukers (Netherlands) Luc Breukers (Netherlands) Rik Breukers (Switzerland) Fabian Danz	Porsche 4.0 L Flat-6	+25 Laps	135
41	**TCX**	**110**	**(France) Chazel Technologie Course**	**(France) Michel Abattu** **(France) Felix Crepet** **(France) Stephane Lipp** **(France) Guillaume Masset**	**Alpine A110 Cup**	**+25 Laps**	**135**
41	**TCX**	**110**	**(France) Chazel Technologie Course**	**(France) Michel Abattu** **(France) Felix Crepet** **(France) Stephane Lipp** **(France) Guillaume Masset**	**Alpine Renault TCe M5Pt 1.8 L Turbo I4**	**+25 Laps**	**135**
42	TCX	193	(France) Chazel Technologie Course	(France) Frederic de Brabant (France) Louka Desgranges (Russia) Ivan Ovsienko	Alpine A110 Cup	+26 Laps	134
42	TCX	193	(France) Chazel Technologie Course	(France) Frederic de Brabant (France) Louka Desgranges (Russia) Ivan Ovsienko	Alpine Renault TCe M5Pt 1.8 L Turbo I4	+26 Laps	134
43 DNF	GTX	701	(France) Vortex V8	(France) Lionel Amrouche (France) Philippe Bonnel (France) Gilles Courtois	Vortex 2.0	+36 Laps	124
43 DNF	GTX	701	(France) Vortex V8	(France) Lionel Amrouche (France) Philippe Bonnel (France) Gilles Courtois	Chevrolet LS3 6.2 L V8	+36 Laps	124
44	TCX	102	(Germany) asBest Racing	(United Arab Emirates) Ahmed Al Khaja (India) Fahad Nasir Khan (United Arab Emirates) Johny Khazzoum	Cupra León TCR	+36 Laps	124
44	TCX	102	(Germany) asBest Racing	(United Arab Emirates) Ahmed Al Khaja (India) Fahad Nasir Khan (United Arab Emirates) Johny Khazzoum	Volkswagen EA888 2.0 L I4	+36 Laps	124
45	GT4	496	(United Arab Emirates) Continental TTR Racing	Stanislav Nonikov; Ilya Sidorov (Australia) Cameron Mcleod	Toyota GR Supra GT4 Evo	+38 Laps	122
45	GT4	496	(United Arab Emirates) Continental TTR Racing	Stanislav Nonikov; Ilya Sidorov (Australia) Cameron Mcleod	BMW B58B30 3.0 L Twin-Turbo I6	+38 Laps	122
46 DNF	GT4	427	(Germany) SRS Team Sorg Rennsport	(Ukraine) Oleksiy Kikireshko (Germany) Jan-Niklas Stieler (United States) Arthur Simondet	Porsche 718 Cayman GT4 RS Clubsport	Accident damage	119
46 DNF	GT4	427	(Germany) SRS Team Sorg Rennsport	(Ukraine) Oleksiy Kikireshko (Germany) Jan-Niklas Stieler (United States) Arthur Simondet	Porsche MDG 4.0 L Flat-6	Accident damage	119
47 DNF	GT3 Am	96	GWR Australia	(Australia) Brett Hobson (Australia) Justin Mcmillan (Australia) Michael Sheargold	Mercedes-AMG GT3 Evo	Oil leak	109
47 DNF	GT3 Am	96	GWR Australia	(Australia) Brett Hobson (Australia) Justin Mcmillan (Australia) Michael Sheargold	Mercedes-AMG M159 6.2 L V8	Oil leak	109
48 DNF	992 Am	911	(France) TFT Racing	(France) Jordan Boisson (France) Patrick Charlaix (Belgium) Benjamin Paque	Porsche 992 GT3 Cup	Crash	83
48 DNF	992 Am	911	(France) TFT Racing	(France) Jordan Boisson (France) Patrick Charlaix (Belgium) Benjamin Paque	Porsche 4.0 L Flat-6	Crash	83
DNC	992 Am	971	(United Arab Emirates) RABDAN by Fulgenzi Racing	(United Arab Emirates) Saif Alameri (United Arab Emirates) Salem Alketbi (Austria) Christopher Zöchling	Porsche 992 GT3 Cup	Fuel filler issues	65
DNC	992 Am	971	(United Arab Emirates) RABDAN by Fulgenzi Racing	(United Arab Emirates) Saif Alameri (United Arab Emirates) Salem Alketbi (Austria) Christopher Zöchling	Porsche 4.0 L Flat-6	Fuel filler issues	65
DNS	992 Am	995	(United Kingdom) Toro Verde GT	(United Kingdom) Graeme Mundy (United Kingdom) Steve Laidlaw (United Kingdom) Callum Davis	Porsche 992 GT3 Cup	Did not start	0
DNS	992 Am	995	(United Kingdom) Toro Verde GT	(United Kingdom) Graeme Mundy (United Kingdom) Steve Laidlaw (United Kingdom) Callum Davis	Porsche 4.0 L Flat-6	Did not start	0
DNC	GTX	750	(United Kingdom) Scott Sport	(Canada) Keith Frieser (Denmark) Mikkel Mac (United Kingdom) Aaron Scott	Lamborghini Huracán Super Trofeo Evo	Tire blowout	11
DNC	GTX	750	(United Kingdom) Scott Sport	(Canada) Keith Frieser (Denmark) Mikkel Mac (United Kingdom) Aaron Scott	Lamborghini 5.2 L V10	Tire blowout	11
DNS	GTX	702	(France) Vortex V8	(France) Arnaud Gomez (France) Olivier Gomez	Vortex 2.0	Did not start	0
DNS	GTX	702	(France) Vortex V8	(France) Arnaud Gomez (France) Olivier Gomez	Chevrolet LS3 6.2 L V8	Did not start	0

== Notes ==
Middle East Trophy
Previous race: Dubai 24 Hour	2025 season	Next race: none
