= 2009 Formula BMW Pacific season =

Seasons
- ← 2008 2010 →

The 2009 Formula BMW Pacific season was the eighth Formula BMW Pacific season. It began on May 2 in Sepang and ended on November 22 in Macau after 15 rounds in five countries. Rio Haryanto became champion with one race to spare, having won the title at Okayama.

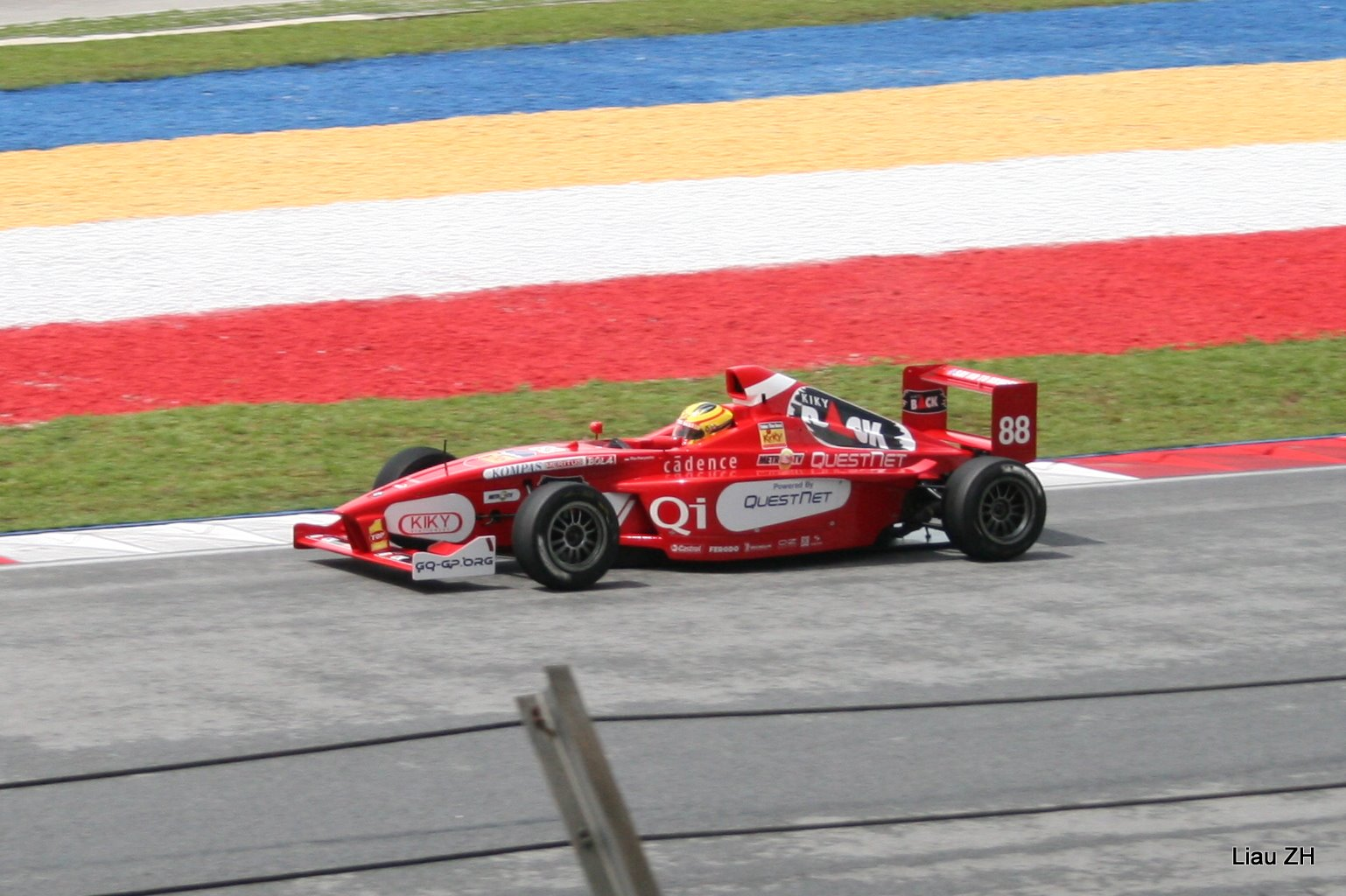
2009 Formula BMW Pacific champion - Rio Haryanto

== Teams and drivers ==
- All cars are powered by BMW engines, and Mygale FB02 chassis. Guest drivers in italics.

Team	No	Driver	Class	Rounds
(Malaysia) Team Holzer PFX	2	(Malaysia) Dominic Ang		All
(Malaysia) Team Holzer PFX	3	(Malaysia) Calvin Wong	R	All
(Malaysia) Team Holzer PFX	4	(Malaysia) Alif Jafri	R	All
(China) Asia Racing Team	5	(Singapore) Suriya Kerisnan	R	4, 6
(China) Asia Racing Team	9	(Israel) Alon Day		6
(Canada) Atlantic Racing Team	6	(India) Aditya Patel		1
(Canada) Atlantic Racing Team	8	(Australia) Steel Guiliana	J R	5–6
(United Kingdom) Motaworld Racing	8	(Australia) Steel Guiliana	J R	1–4
(South Korea) E-Rain Racing	7	(Republic of Ireland) Gary Thompson	R	All
(South Korea) E-Rain Racing	17	(Malaysia) Fahmi Ilyas	R	All
(South Korea) E-Rain Racing	27	(Saudi Arabia) Fahad Algosaibi	R	1–2, 4–5
(South Korea) E-Rain Racing	49	(India) Akhil Dinesh Khushlani		All
(Malaysia) Eurasia Motorsport	10	(Spain) Antonio Martínez	R	2
(Malaysia) Eurasia Motorsport	11	(Australia) Chris Wootton		All
(Malaysia) Eurasia Motorsport	12	(United Kingdom) Jack Harvey		4
(Malaysia) Eurasia Motorsport	22	(Zimbabwe) Axcil Jefferies	J R	All
(Malaysia) Eurasia Motorsport	26	(Hong Kong) Paul Lau		4, 6
(Malaysia) Eurasia Motorsport	30	(United Kingdom) James Cole		6
(Malaysia) Eurasia Motorsport	33	(Japan) Daiki Sasaki		5
(Macau) Ao's Racing	16	(China) Hong Wei Cao		1–2, 4, 6
(United States) EuroInternational	18	(France) Jim Pla		6
(United States) EuroInternational	19	(United Kingdom) William Buller		6
(United States) EuroInternational	20	(Australia) James Kovacic		4–5
(United States) EuroInternational	21	(Brazil) Felipe Nasr		4, 6
(United States) EuroInternational	23	(Spain) Facundo Regalia		5–6
(United States) EuroInternational	42	(United States) Michael Lewis		4–5
(United Kingdom) Räikkönen Robertson Racing	28	(Malaysia) Jazeman Jaafar		6
(Malaysia) Questnet Team Qi-Meritus	28	(China) Huan Zhu		1
(Malaysia) Questnet Team Qi-Meritus	38	(Indonesia) Dustin Sofyan	R	All
(Malaysia) Questnet Team Qi-Meritus	88	(Indonesia) Rio Haryanto		All
(Hong Kong) Champ Motorsport	29	(Hong Kong) Jim Ka To		6
(China) TopSpeed Racing Shanghai	34	(Japan) Tomoki Nojiri		6

Icon	Class
R	Rookie driver
J	Junior driver

== Calendar ==
Round		Circuit	Date	Pole position	Fastest lap	Winning driver	Winning team	Supporting
1	R1	(Malaysia) Sepang	4 April	(Republic of Ireland) Gary Thompson	(Republic of Ireland) Gary Thompson	(Republic of Ireland) Gary Thompson	(South Korea) E-Rain Racing	Malaysian Grand Prix
1	R2	(Malaysia) Sepang	5 April	(Republic of Ireland) Gary Thompson	(Indonesia) Rio Haryanto	(Indonesia) Rio Haryanto	(Malaysia) Questnet Team Qi-Meritus	Malaysian Grand Prix
2	R1	(Malaysia) Sepang	30 May	(Australia) Chris Wootton	(Republic of Ireland) Gary Thompson	(Zimbabwe) Axcil Jefferies	(Malaysia) Eurasia Motorsport	Asian Festival of Speed
2	R2	(Malaysia) Sepang	30 May	(Australia) Chris Wootton	(Indonesia) Rio Haryanto	(Malaysia) Fahmi Ilyas	(South Korea) E-Rain Racing	Asian Festival of Speed
2	R3	(Malaysia) Sepang	31 May	(Zimbabwe) Axcil Jefferies	(India) Akhil Dinesh Khushlani	(Zimbabwe) Axcil Jefferies	(Malaysia) Eurasia Motorsport	Asian Festival of Speed
2	R4	(Malaysia) Sepang	31 May	(Malaysia) Fahmi Ilyas	(Republic of Ireland) Gary Thompson	(Indonesia) Rio Haryanto	(Malaysia) Questnet Team Qi-Meritus	Asian Festival of Speed
3	R1	(Indonesia) Sentul	15 August	(Indonesia) Rio Haryanto	(Indonesia) Rio Haryanto	(Indonesia) Rio Haryanto	(Malaysia) Questnet Team Qi-Meritus	Asian Festival of Speed
3	R2	(Indonesia) Sentul	15 August	(Indonesia) Rio Haryanto	(Indonesia) Rio Haryanto	(Indonesia) Rio Haryanto	(Malaysia) Questnet Team Qi-Meritus	Asian Festival of Speed
3	R3	(Indonesia) Sentul	16 August	(Indonesia) Rio Haryanto	(Indonesia) Rio Haryanto	(Indonesia) Rio Haryanto	(Malaysia) Questnet Team Qi-Meritus	Asian Festival of Speed
3	R4	(Indonesia) Sentul	16 August	(Indonesia) Rio Haryanto	(Indonesia) Rio Haryanto	(Indonesia) Rio Haryanto	(Malaysia) Questnet Team Qi-Meritus	Asian Festival of Speed
4	R1	Singapore	26 September	(Indonesia) Rio Haryanto*	(Republic of Ireland) Gary Thompson*	(Indonesia) Rio Haryanto*	(Malaysia) Questnet Team Qi-Meritus*	Singapore Grand Prix
4	R2	Singapore	27 September	(Malaysia) Fahmi Ilyas*	(Zimbabwe) Axcil Jefferies*	(Indonesia) Rio Haryanto*	(Malaysia) Questnet Team Qi-Meritus*	Singapore Grand Prix
5	R1	(Japan) Okayama	31 October	(Zimbabwe) Axcil Jefferies*	(Indonesia) Rio Haryanto*	(Indonesia) Rio Haryanto*	(Malaysia) Questnet Team Qi-Meritus*	World Touring Car Championship
5	R2	(Japan) Okayama	1 November	(Indonesia) Rio Haryanto*	(Indonesia) Rio Haryanto*	(Indonesia) Rio Haryanto*	(Malaysia) Questnet Team Qi-Meritus*	World Touring Car Championship
6	R1	Macau	22 November	(Indonesia) Rio Haryanto*	(Indonesia) Rio Haryanto*	(Indonesia) Rio Haryanto*	(Malaysia) Questnet Team Qi-Meritus*	Macau Grand Prix

* At the last three rounds, guest drivers started from pole position, setting the fastest lap before winning the race. In Singapore, Felipe Nasr achieved that before Facundo Regalia (Okayama) and William Buller did so in Macau.

== Standings ==
- Points are awarded as follows:

	1	2	3	4	5	6	7	8	9	10	PP
Race 1	20	15	12	10	8	6	4	3	2	1	**1**

Pos	Driver	SEP1 1 (Malaysia)	SEP1 2 (Malaysia)	SEP2 1 (Malaysia)	SEP2 2 (Malaysia)	SEP2 3 (Malaysia)	SEP2 4 (Malaysia)	SEN 1 (Indonesia)	SEN 2 (Indonesia)	SEN 3 (Indonesia)	SEN 4 (Indonesia)	SIN 1 (Singapore)	SIN 2 (Singapore)	OKA 1 (Japan)	OKA 2 (Japan)	MAC 1 (Macau)	Pts
1	(Indonesia) Rio Haryanto	3	1	Ret	3	4	1	**1**	**1**	**1**	**1**	**2**	4	2	**2**	**3**	250
2	(Republic of Ireland) Gary Thompson	**1**	**3**	2	2	2	4	3	3	2	3	5	9	3	6	Ret	180
3	(Zimbabwe) Axcil Jefferies	4	Ret	1	4	**1**	3	4	2	3	2	Ret	5	**Ret**	7	5	163
4	(Malaysia) Fahmi Ilyas	7	Ret	11	1	8	**2**	2	6	6	7	9	**Ret**	Ret	5	8	102
5	(Indonesia) Dustin Sofyan	5	Ret	4	5	5	7	6	5	5	4	14	11	13	13	6	89
6	(India) Akhil Dinesh Khushlani	8	Ret	3	Ret	3	5	7	4	4	5	Ret	12	6	11	Ret	82
7	(Australia) Chris Wootton	2	2	**12**	**Ret**	Ret	6	Ret	Ret	7	6	6	6	9	8	Ret	78.5
8	(Malaysia) Calvin Wong	6	4	5	Ret	7	9	Ret	8	Ret	8	8	8	10	4	Ret	69
9	(Malaysia) Dominic Ang	11	7	8	7	6	10	5	9	9	9	17	7	Ret	12	Ret	46
10	(Australia) Steel Guiliana	14	9	10	9	12	14	8	Ret	8	10	13	10	5	10	Ret	35
11	(Saudi Arabia) Fahad Algosaibi	13	8	6	8	11	12					10	16	12	Ret		19.5
12	(China) Hong Wei Cao	10	5	Ret	DNS	9	11					7	14			Ret	19
13	(Malaysia) Alif Jafri	Ret	11	9	Ret	13	13	9	7	10	11	12	Ret	11	14	Ret	17
14	(India) Aditya Patel	9	6														5
15	(China) Huan Zhu	12	10														0.5
16	(Singapore) Suriya Kerisnan											15	Ret			7	0
guest drivers ineligible for points
	(Brazil) Felipe Nasr											**1**	**1**			DSQ	0
	(Argentina) Facundo Regalia													**1**	**1**	Ret	0
	(United Kingdom) William Buller															**1**	0
	(United States) Michael Lewis											11	2	4	Ret		0
	(France) Jim Pla															2	0
	(Australia) James Kovacic											3	3	7	3		0
	(United Kingdom) Jack Harvey											4	13				0
	(Hong Kong) Jim Ka To															4	0
	(Spain) Antonio Martínez			7	6	10	8										0
	(Japan) Daiki Sasaki													8	9		0
	(Hong Kong) Paul Lau											16	15			Ret	0
	(United Kingdom) James Cole															Ret	0
	(Israel) Alon Day															Ret	0
	(Malaysia) Jazeman Jaafar															Ret	0
	(Japan) Tomoki Nojiri															Ret	0
Pos	Driver	SEP1 1 (Malaysia)	SEP1 2 (Malaysia)	SEP2 1 (Malaysia)	SEP2 2 (Malaysia)	SEP2 3 (Malaysia)	SEP2 4 (Malaysia)	SEN 1 (Indonesia)	SEN 2 (Indonesia)	SEN 3 (Indonesia)	SEN 4 (Indonesia)	SIN 1 (Singapore)	SIN 2 (Singapore)	OKA 1 (Japan)	OKA 2 (Japan)	MAC 1 (Macau)	Pts

Colour	Result
Gold	Winner
Silver	Second place
Bronze	Third place
Green	Points classification
Blue	Non-points classification
Blue	Non-classified finish (NC)
Purple	Retired, not classified (Ret)
Red	Did not qualify (DNQ)
Red	Did not pre-qualify (DNPQ)
Black	Disqualified (DSQ)
White	Did not start (DNS)
White	Withdrew (WD)
White	Race cancelled (C)
Blank	Did not practice (DNP)
Blank	Did not arrive (DNA)
Blank	Excluded (EX)

**Bold** – Pole
Italics – Fastest Lap
**W** – Wet Race

Note: In the second race at the Sepang F1 support event, due to insufficient distance covered, half points were awarded.
