= Damien White =

Racing driver from Australia

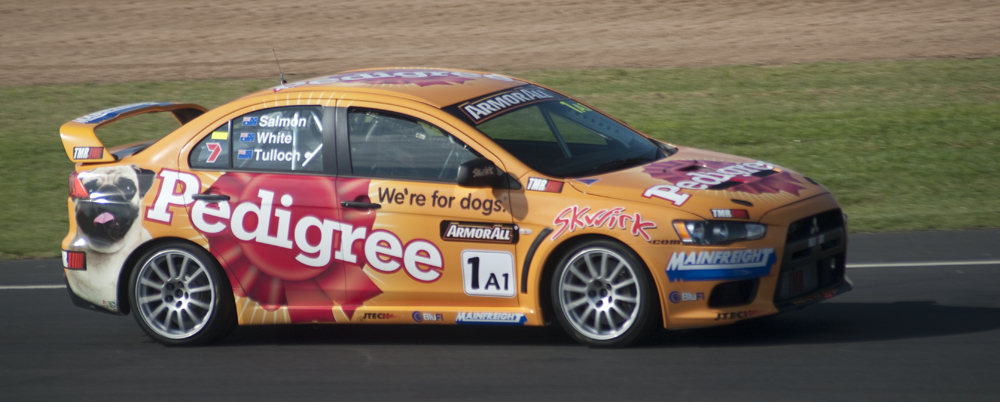
- Nationality: Australian
- Born: 11 March 1976 (age 50) Wollongong, New South Wales

V8 Supercars
- Years active: 1999–2000, 2005, 2007
- Teams: Rod Salmon Racing; Britek Motorsport; Brad Jones Racing
- Starts: 6
- Wins: 0
- Poles: 0
- Fastest laps: 0
- Best finish: 55th in 2000

Previous series
- 1997 2001–2006, 2008 2003 2006–2007 2008: Australian Formula Ford Championship; V8 Ute Racing Series; Australian Formula 3 Championship; Fujitsu V8 Supercar Series; Australian Mini Challenge

Championship titles
- 2004, 2005: V8 Ute Racing Series

Damien White (born 11 March 1976) is a racing driver and motorsport administrator from Australia.

== Biography ==
White began his motorsport career as a driver. Having spent his early seasons in Formula Ford and production car racing, he moved up to the V8 Supercars paddock at the turn of the millennium. He was a regular and a frontrunner in the V8 Utes, taking back-to-back titles in the mid-2000s for both Ford and Holden as well as two overall second-places. His success in V8 Utes led to a full season of Development Series in 2007, finishing sixth in the standings. White made sporadic appearances in V8 Supercar endurance rounds between 1999 and 2007 – with a best result of two 17th places at the Bathurst 1000 in 2000 and 2005 from six championship starts.

White moved into motorsport administration in 2009, joining V8 Supercars as operations co-ordinator before becoming the General Manager of Motorsport four years later. White resigned from his V8 Supercars role in 2015, moving into a commercial operations role with the then-under construction The Bend Motorsport Park and later a managerial role with the under-construction Circuit Italia.

White is no relation to DVS driver/team owner Matthew White or former V8 Supercars commentator Matthew White.

== Results ==
=== Career summary ===
Season	Series	Position	Car	Team
1997	Australian Formula Ford Championship	17th	Spectrum–Ford 06	Team Arrow
1999	Shell Championship Series	NC	Holden Commodore VS	Rod Salmon Racing
2000	Shell Championship Series	55th	Ford Falcon AU	Rod Salmon Racing
2001	V8 Ute Racing Series	2nd	Ford Falcon AU Ute	
2002	V8 Ute Racing Series	2nd	Ford Falcon AU Ute	Peter Boylan
2003	V8 Ute Racing Series	5th	Ford Falcon AU Ute	Peter Boylan
2003	Australian Formula 3 Championship	18th	Dallara–Alfa Romeo F301	Scuderia Piccola
2004	V8 Ute Racing Series	1st	Holden Commodore VY Ute	
2005	V8 Ute Racing Series	1st	Ford Falcon BA Ute	Wollongong Performance Racing
2005	V8 Supercar Championship Series	57th	Ford Falcon BA	Britek Motorsport
2006	V8 Ute Racing Series	6th	Ford Falcon BF Ute	Team IMB
2006	Fujitsu V8 Supercar Series	40th	Holden Commodore VZ	Mark Petch Motorsport
2007	Fujitsu V8 Supercar Series	6th	Holden Commodore VZ	Wollongong Performance Racing
2007	V8 Supercar Championship Series	NC	Ford Falcon BF	Brad Jones Racing
2008	V8 Ute Racing Series	44th	Holden Commodore VE Ute	Kanga Loaders Racing
2008	Australian Mini Challenge	14th	Mini Cooper JCW R56 Challenge	Mini

=== Complete V8 Supercars results ===
Year	Team	1	2	3	4	5	6	7	8	9	10	11	12	13	14	Pos.	Pts.
1999	Rod Salmon Racing	ECK	ADE	PER	PHI	DAR	SAN	IPS2	CPK	LAU	WIN	OPK; DNQ	IPS2	BAT; DNF		NC	0
2000	Rod Salmon Racing	PHI	PER	ADE	ECK	DAR	CAN	IPS1	WIN	OPK	CPK	IPS2; DNF	SAN; WD	BAT; 17		55th	36
2005	Britek Motorsport	ADE	PUK	PER	ECK	SHA	DAR	IPS	OPK	SAN; 24	BAT; 17	GCS	LAU	PHI		58th	128
2007	Brad Jones Racing	ADE	PER	PUK	WIN	ECK	DAR	IPS	OPK	SAN; DNF	BAT; DNS	GCS	BHR	LAU	PHI	NC	0

=== Complete Bathurst 1000 results ===
Year	Team	Car	Co-driver	Position	Laps
1999	Rod Salmon Racing	Holden Commodore VS	(Australia) Rod Salmon	DNF	83
2000	Rod Salmon Racing	Ford Falcon AU	(Australia) Rod Salmon	17th	155
2005	Britek Motorsport	Ford Falcon BA	(Australia) José Fernández	17th	148
2007	Brad Jones Racing	Ford Falcon BF	(Singapore) Christian Murchison	DNS	0

=== Complete Bathurst 24 Hours results ===
Year	Team	Co-drivers	Car	Class	Laps	Ovr. Pos.	Class Pos.
2002	(Australia) Peter Boylan	(Australia) Peter Boylan (Australia) Peter McKay	BMW M3	5	491	6th	1st

=== Complete Bathurst 12 Hours results ===
Year	Team	Co-drivers	Car	Class	Laps	Ovr. Pos.	Class Pos.
2008	(Australia) Rod Salmon Racing	(Australia) Rod Salmon (Australia) Graham Alexander	Mitsubishi Lancer Evo IX	A	253	1st	1st
2009	(Australia) Rod Salmon Racing	(Australia) Rod Salmon (Australia) Tony Longhurst	Mitsubishi Lancer RS Evo X	C	239	1st	1st
2010	(Australia) Rod Salmon Racing	(Australia) Rod Salmon (New Zealand) Ian Tulloch	Mitsubishi Lancer RS Evo X	A	155	DNF	DNF
