= Chris Wootton =

Australian racing driver (born 1988)

- Chris After Winning FBMW Scholarship 2008
- Nationality: (Australia) Australian
- Born: 11 December 1988 (age 37) Paddington (Australia)

Australian Mini Challenge career
- Current team: Chris Wootton Racing
- Car number: 3
- Best finish: 10th in 2010 Australian Mini Challenge

Previous series
- 2010 2008–09: Formula 1600 India; Formula BMW Pacific

Awards
- 2008–09: Formula BMW Scholarship

Christopher James Wootton (born 11 December 1988 in Darlinghurst, New South Wales) is an Australian racing driver.

With racing in his blood, Wootton commenced his motor sporting career in karting in December 2004, at the Gold Coast Christmas race meeting. He had instant success becoming rookie of the year in two classes in the "2005 Queensland Karter of the Year" as well as many podiums in his inaugural year.

The Wootton family have been involved in motor sport since the 1960s in Australia. Chris's family were successful in circuit racing and rallying, competing at Bathurst Hardie Ferodo 500, the Surfers Paradise 24 hr races as well as winning many coveted events. His father, Ken, competed in rallying and circuit events throughout NSW.

He competed in the Mark Webber Tasmania Challenge in 2007 in the Ace Adventure Team.

Wootton competed against 26 of the top drivers from the region, including nine other Australians, for a Formula BMW Pacific scholarship. The exhaustive trials were held at Malaysia's Sepang International Circuit from 13 to 16 December. Wootton now carries the prestigious title of Formula BMW Junior, and will receive expert coaching and tuition throughout the season from BMW Motorsport professionals.

Wootton, who was amongst 26 candidates from 12 different nations taking part in the trials, has been offered 50,000 Euro (approximately 85 000 AUD) of financial assistance towards the cost of a season in the region's premier entry-level single seater series, as well as a full year in the unrivalled Formula BMW Pacific Education & Coaching program.

Wootton won the BMW Scholarship in 2009. He is the current official lap record holder at Sepang in a Formula BMW.

== Career results ==
Season	Series	Position	Car	Team
2008	Formula BMW Pacific	7th	Mygale FB02 BMW	Team Meritus
2008	Australian Mini Challenge	39th	Mini Cooper S JCW R56	
2009	Formula BMW Pacific	7th	Mygale FB02 BMW	Eurasia Motorsport
2010	Toyota Racing Series	15th	Tatuus TT104ZZ Toyota	Triple X Motorsport
2010	Australian Mini Challenge	10th	Mini Cooper S JCW R56	
