= Circuit Italia =

Race track in New South Wales, Australia

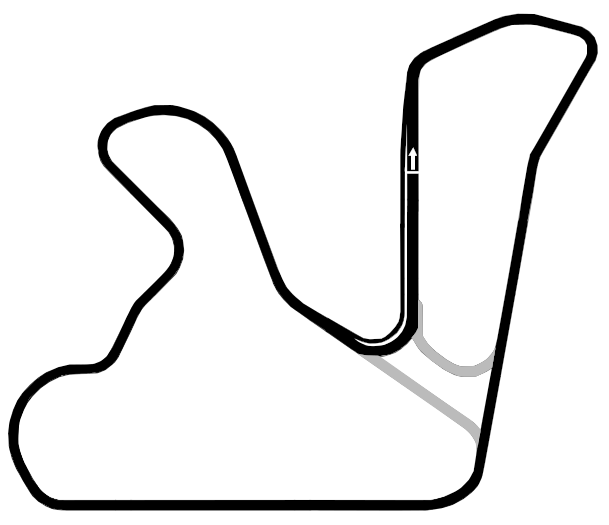
- Proposed circuit layout c.2017
- Location: 49 Italia Road, Balickera, New South Wales, Australia
- Coordinates: 32°40′53.60″S 151°48′20.39″E
- Opened: 25 June 2025
- Length: 3.1 km (1.9 mi)
- Turns: 15

Circuit Italia is a permanent race track in the Hunter Region of New South Wales, Australia.

== History ==
Planning for a permanent circuit alongside the existing Ringwood Motor Racing Complex in Port Stephens began in 2013, with local businessman Matthew Higgins confirming AU$12 million of investment in the project in July 2016. Construction began on the circuit – named after its address on Italia Road – in 2017, with 30% of the project completed prior to a hiatus related to Higgins' other projects.

Following a lengthy silence on the progression of construction, asphalt laying began in July 2023. The circuit was slated for completion in September 2023, however it took until March 2024 for barriers to be fully installed. The venue was eventually declared open on 25 June 2025, with a track day hosted by David Russell slated to be the first official running.

The venue was mooted as a potential host for the Newcastle 500 after the original circuit fell out of favour with the local council, but was allegedly snubbed in favour of a proposed event in Cessnock according to circuit manager Damien White.
