= 2008 Australian Mini Challenge =

Mini Challenge

The 2008 Australian Mini Challenge was the inaugural running of the Australian Mini Challenge. It began on 7 March at Eastern Creek Raceway and ended on 7 December at Oran Park Raceway.

== Teams and drivers ==
The following teams and drivers contested the 2008 Australian Mini Challenge.

Team	No	Drivers
Decorug Racing	5	(Australia) Nathan Geier
Decorug Racing	27	(Australia) Paul Stokell
Decorug Racing	95	(Australia) Grant Denyer (Australia) Nathan Geier
Bib Stillwell Mini Garage	6	(Australia) Michael Stillwell
Bib Stillwell Mini Garage	60	(Australia) Nicholas Stillwell (Australia) David Stillwell
Bib Stillwell Mini Garage	66	(Australia) Gary Young
Racer Industries	7	(Australia) Ryan McLeod
Doulman Automotive	8	(Australia) Neil McFadyen
Glory Team Racing	10	(Australia) David Turner
Mini	13	(Australia) Ben Tune
Mini	18	(Australia) Damien White
Kingsway Mini Garage	16	(Australia) Tim Leahey (Australia) Robert Graham
Motorline Mini Garage	21	(Australia) Darren Berry
Motorline Mini Garage	22	(Australia) Todd Wanless (Australia) Paul Morris
Motorline Mini Garage	43	(United Kingdom) Matt Neal (Australia) Brendon Cook
Motorline Mini Garage	80	(Australia) Jason Akermanis
Brisbane Mini Garage	23	(Australia) Todd Fiore
Brisbane Mini Garage	30	(Australia) Paul Fiore
BMW Uber Star	25	(Australia) Jason Bargwanna (Australia) Shaun Cleary (Australia) Leanne Tander (Australia) Paul Mercurio (Australia) Bob Holden (United States) Boris Said (Australia) Stuart Appleby (Australia) Justin Hemmes
Iron House Brewery	32	(Australia) Jason White
PDL Electrical Solutions	44	(New Zealand) Brent Collins
Trivett Classic Race Team	79	(Australia) Scott Bargwanna
Trivett Classic Race Team	97	(Australia) Jason Bargwanna
Bruce Lynton Mini Garage	80; 99	(Australia) Beric Lynton
Darren Harris	93	(Australia) Chris Wootton

== Calendar ==
The 2008 Australian Mini Challenge will be contested over eight rounds, starting at Eastern Creek in March and finishing at Oran Park in December.

Rd.	Supporting	Circuit	City / State	Date	Winner
1	V8SCS 2	Eastern Creek Raceway	Sydney, New South Wales	7–9 Mar	Neil McFadyen
2	FV8SCS 2	Wakefield Park	Goulburn, New South Wales	4–6 Apr	Nathan Geier
3	V8SCS 4	Barbagallo Raceway	Perth, Western Australia	9–11 May	Damien White
4	V8SCS 5	Sandown International Raceway	Melbourne, Victoria	7–9 Jun	Jason Bargwanna
5	V8SCS 9	Phillip Island Grand Prix Circuit	Phillip Island, Victoria	12–14 Sep	Jason Bargwanna
6	V8SCS 10	Mount Panorama	Bathurst, New South Wales	9–12 Oct	Jason Bargwanna
7	V8SCS 13	Symmons Plains Raceway	Launceston, Tasmania	21–23 Nov	Paul Stokell
8	V8SCS 14	Oran Park Raceway	Sydney, New South Wales	4–7 Dec	Jason Bargwanna

- V8SCS - V8 Supercar Championship Series
- FV8SCS - Fujitsu V8 Supercars Series

== Driver standings ==
After round 8:

Pos	Driver	Rd 1	Rd 2	Rd 3	Rd 4	Rd 5	Rd 6	Rd 7	Rd 8	Pts
1	Neil McFadyen	168	?	138	132	78	65	126	117	930
2	Paul Stokell	156	?	75	84	69	90	180	138	906
3	Paul Fiore	102	?	78	84	135	51	102	132	834
4	Jason Bargwanna	126			180	180	120	150	168	798
5	Nathan Geier	?	?	48	90	165	48	57	27	717
6	Grant Denyer*	?	?	138	150	54				648
7	Gary Young	?	?	114	63	60	27	105	42	585
8	Todd Fiore	?	?	93	84	120	15	54	87	558
9	Scott Bargwanna				69	?	?	78	111	432
10	David Turner	?	?	36	36	57	12	24	48	357
11	Nathan Callaghan			138	105					243
12	Todd Wanless				?	?	?	?	?	237
13	Nicholas Stillwell			?	?	?	?	?	?	171
14	Damien White			156						156
15	Darren Berry	?		?	?	?	?	?	?	153
Pos	Driver	Rd 1	Rd 2	Rd 3	Rd 4	Rd 5	Rd 6	Rd 7	Rd 8	Pts

Colour	Result
Gold	Winner
Silver	Second place
Bronze	Third place
Green	Points classification
Blue	Non-points classification
Blue	Non-classified finish (NC)
Purple	Retired, not classified (Ret)
Red	Did not qualify (DNQ)
Red	Did not pre-qualify (DNPQ)
Black	Disqualified (DSQ)
White	Did not start (DNS)
White	Withdrew (WD)
White	Race cancelled (C)
Blank	Did not practice (DNP)
Blank	Did not arrive (DNA)
Blank	Excluded (EX)

The other results were 16th: Michael Stillwell – 132 17th: Iain Sherrin – 117 18th: Robert Graham – 111 19th: David Stillwell – 108 20th: Brent Collins – 96 21st: Jason White – 96 22nd: Paul Morris – 84 23rd: Barry Sternbeck – 78 24th: Matt Neal – 78 25th: Beric Lynton – 75 26th: Mike Sherrin – 69 27th: Damien Flack – 60 28th: Tim Leahey – 54 29th: Christopher Oxley – 54 30th: Ricky Occhipinti – 54 31st: Brendon Cook – 51 32nd: Jim Sweeney – 42 33rd: Callum Ballinger – 39 34th: Tim Poulton – 30 35th: Edward Singleton – 27 36th: Kevin Miller – 18 37th: Jason Akermanis – 18 38th: Ryan Mcleod – 15 39th: Chris Wootton – 9
