= Axcil Jefferies =

British / Zimbabwean racing driver

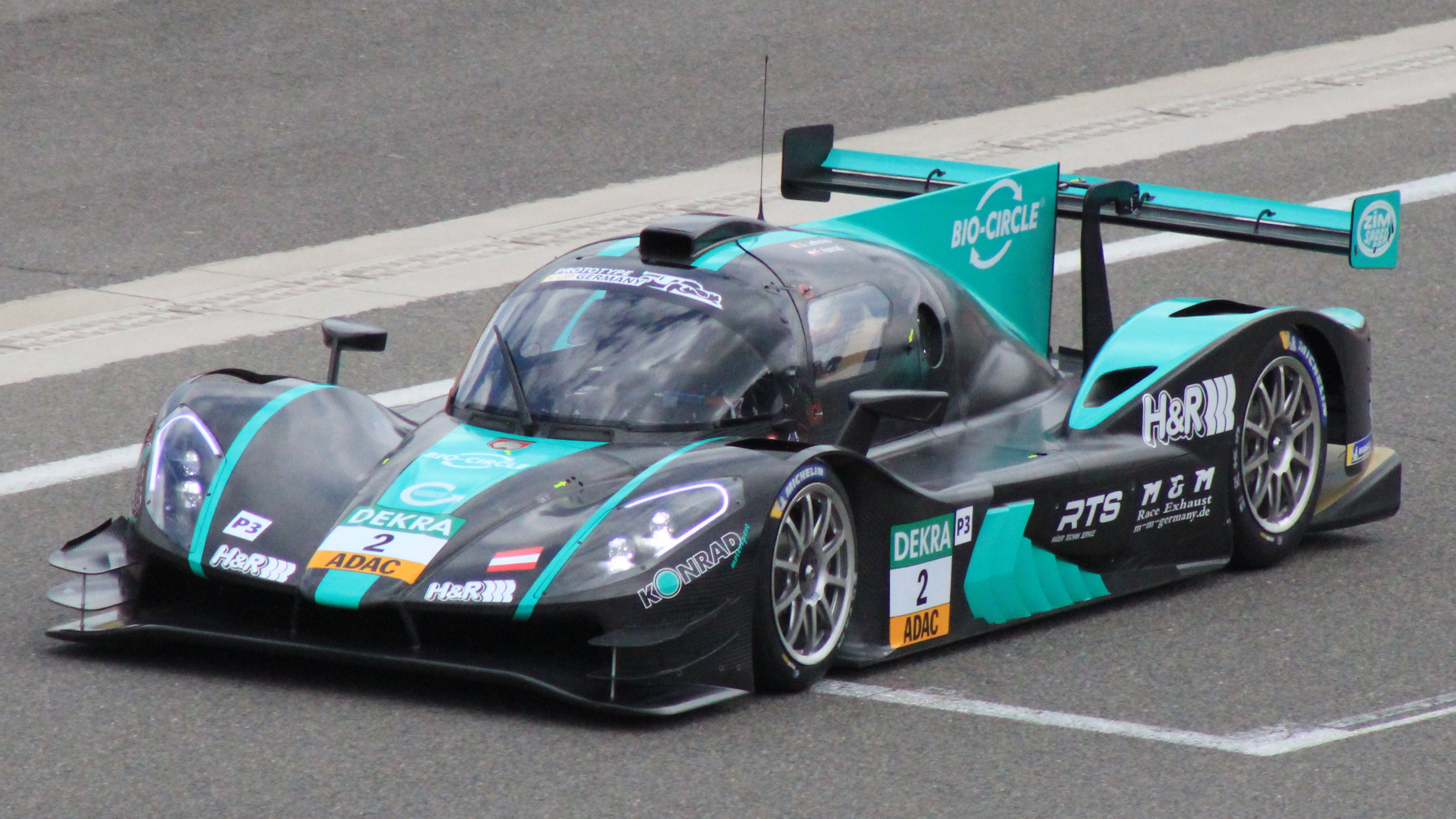
- Jefferies in 2022
- Nationality: (Zimbabwe) Zimbabwean
- Born: Axcil Ramar Jefferies; 14 April 1994 (age 32) Slough, England, United Kingdom

Lamborghini Super Trofeo career
- Debut season: 2017
- Current team: Konrad Motorsport
- Categorisation: FIA Silver

Previous series
- 2014 2013–14 2012 2009–2010: GP2 Series; Indy Lights; FIA Formula Two Championship; Formula BMW Pacific

Championship titles
- 2024 2017-2018: European Le Mans Series - LMGT3; Lamborghini Super Trofeo Middle East

Axcil Ramar Jefferies (born 14 April 1994) is a Zimbabwean professional racing driver. He previously held the Nürburgring Nordschleife lap record in the GT3 class with a time of 7:50.370 which he set in a Konrad Motorsport Lamborghini Huracán GT3. He has competed in the GP2 Series, GT World Challenge Europe and European Le Mans Series, and is a senior race instructor at Yas Marina Circuit in Abu Dhabi.

== Career ==
=== Karting ===
Jefferies started his motorsport career aged six in Zimbabwe, and went on to win several national championships in Zimbabwe and South Africa before moving to Europe. In 2007 and 2008, he won races in the European Karting Championship.

=== Formula BMW ===
Jefferies contested the Formula BMW Pacific series in 2009 and 2010. He finished third overall in the 2009 season, taking pole position at Sepang and Okayama, and winning two races at Sepang and a total of twelve podiums. He completed a limited schedule in 2010, with two wins and four podiums.

=== FIA Formula Two Championship ===
In 2012, after not racing for two years, Jefferies returned to action in FIA Formula Two halfway through the season with a best of fifth in wet conditions at Circuit de Spa-Francorchamps in Belgium. He finished twelfth in the championship standings.

=== Indy Lights and GP2 ===
In 2013, Jefferies made his debut in the American Firestone Indy Lights series with Bryan Herta Autosport at the Mid-Ohio Sports Car Course and finished seventh. He competed again two months later at the Houston race and finished fifth. In 2014, Jefferies competed in the Indy Lights Indy 200 at Mid-Ohio, finishing sixth in the first race and fourth in the second race.

In 2014, Jefferies made his GP2 debut at the Bahrain International Circuit. In race one, he was hit by Kimiya Sato and forced to retire. In the second race, he made up several positions after starting from the back.

=== Lamborghini Super Trofeo ===
In 2017, Jefferies competed in the Lamborghini Super Trofeo Middle East. Jefferies dominated the first round at the Yas Marina Circuit by being fastest in all practice sessions, taking pole position and winning the race. Round 2 was held at Dubai Autodrome, where again Jefferies was on pole in the Pro Class and won both races. Round 5 and 6 saw Jefferies on pole again in dominant fashion and winning both races to clinch the overall championship.

Jefferies continued his top form in his debut in the Lamborghini Super Trofeo Europe by setting the fastest time in official practice for the first round at Monza Circuit. He then qualified third overall on Saturday and won the first race and finishedsecond in the second race. He left Monza leading the championship. Jefferies continued his good form with two third place finishes at Circuit Paul Ricard, a third place at the Silverstone Circuit, another win and a third place at Spa Francorchamps and a third place at the Nürburgring. Another two podiums in Imola saw Jefferies finish as runner-up in the championship. He then finished second in the World Finals.

In 2018, Jefferies defended his Middle East Championship, this time running with Konrad Motorsport. He scored with five podiums, including three wins.

=== GT racing ===
==== 24H Series ====
Jefferies competed in his first 24-hour long race at the Circuit Paul Ricard in France during the weekend of 6 and 7 May 2017 with the GP Extreme team as part of the 24H Series. He qualified the Renault R.S. 01 GT3 in fourth place overall. After a hard-fought battle Jefferies and his team finished fourth overall. In August 2017, Jefferies completed his second 24-hour long race at the Algarve International Circuit, again with GP Extreme in the Renault R.S. 01. The team qualified second and were sitting in the top-three for the first twelve hours before a mechanical fault dropped them to an eventual eighth place finish overall.

Jefferies competed in the 2019 Dubai 24 Hour. He raced for GPX Racing in the Renault R.S. 01 in the Pro-Am category, qualifying sixth overall and taking the start for the team. The transmission failed on lap 8 and unfortunately no replacement gearbox was available for the team so the car was retired. In November 2019, Jeffries competed in the 24-hour race in at Circuit of the Americas with Toksport WRT in the Mercedes AMG GT3. The team qualified in second position and battled for the lead for 22 hours with the Black Falcon Mercedes AMG GT3 until a mechanical fault caused the team to lose five laps and finish fifth overall.

January 2020 kicked off on a high with Jefferies taking the wheel of the Toksport WRT Mercedes AMG GT3 for the Dubai 24 hour race. He qualified in eighth position. Taking the start of the race, Jefferies made up five positions on track before handing the car over to Martin Konrad in third. The car finished the race as second in the Pro-Am class.

In January 2021, Jefferies won the Dubai 24 Hour with GPX Racing. He shared the No. 36 Porsche 911 GT3-R with Mathieu Jaminet, Julien Andlauer, Frédéric Fatien and Alain Ferté.

In January 2022, Jefferies repeated his 2021 win by again winning in the Dubai 24 Hour. This time, he competed with MS7 by WRT in an Audi R8 LMS alongside Dries Vanthoor, Christopher Mies, Thomas Neubauer and Mohammed Saud Fahad Al Saud. The team completed a total of 596 laps beating the sister car to second place by a single lap. It was a dominant performance by team WRT after winning pole position and leading for more than 500 laps. Jefferies became only the sixth driver to win the race consecutively.

==== Nürburgring Endurance Series ====
Jefferies competed in the 2019 VLN Series. He took several podiums and top-ten qualifying positions in his first season in the series based at the Nürburgring Nordschleife. Konrad Motorsport also fielded Jefferies in the 24 Hours of Nürburgring race alongside Marco Mapelli, Michele Di Martino and Michael Lyons.

In 2020, Jefferies completed his second full season in the Nürburgring Endurance Series with Konrad Motorsport. The team finished the season with three podiums. Jefferies also qualified the car in sixth overall at the 24 Hours of Nürburgring.

In 2021, Jefferies competed in the Nürburgring Endurance Series for a third year. He achieved several front row starts in the NLS and finished the season with two podiums.

In the first round of the 2022 Nürburgring Endurance Series, Jefferies took the Nürburgring Endurance Series lap record in the GT3-class, driving in the Lamborghini Huracán GT3 Evo of Konrad Motorsport.

==== GT World Challenge Europe Sprint ====
In 2020, Jefferies made his debut in the GT World Challenge Europe Sprint Cup in the Silver category with Ezequiel Pérez Companc's Madpanda Motorsport. He finished second in the Silver Cup.

==== FIA World Endurance Championship ====
In 2023, Jefferies landed a seat with Northwest AMR's GTE Am class entry alongside Paul Dalla Lana and Nicki Thiim. Jefferies essentially won the seat at the WEC Prologue, where he and Thomas Merrill competed for the final seat in the entry.

=== Prototypes ===
In 2021, Jefferies debuted in an LMP3-class Ligier JS P320 with Frikadelli Racing.

== Personal life ==
In 2014, Jefferies was appointed as a UN AIDS Ambassador for the United Nations Aids Campaign.

In 2017, Jefferies was drafted into the Lamborghini Young Driver Program.

== Racing record ==
=== Career summary ===
Season	Series	Team	Races	Wins	Poles	F/Laps	Podiums	Points	Position
2009	Formula BMW Pacific	Eurasia Motorsport	15	2	2	1	6	163	**3rd**
2010	Formula BMW Pacific	Motaworld Racing	2	0	0	0	0	18	15th
2012	FIA Formula Two Championship	MotorSport Vision	12	0	0	0	0	17	12th
2013	Indy Lights	Bryan Herta Autosport Jeffery Mark Motorsports	2	0	0	0	0	56	11th
2014	Indy Lights	Belardi Auto Racing	2	0	0	0	0	60	14th
2014	GP2 Series	Trident	2	0	0	0	0	0	34th
2017	Lamborghini Super Trofeo Middle East - Pro	GDL Racing	6	5	3	0	5	81	**1st**
2017	Lamborghini Super Trofeo Europe - Pro	GDL Racing	12	2	0	0	9	127	**2nd**
2017	Lamborghini Super Trofeo World Final - Pro	GDL Racing	2	0	0	0	1	0	NC
2017	24H Series - A6	GP Extreme	2	0	0	0	0	27	29th
2018	Lamborghini Super Trofeo Middle East - Pro	Konrad Motorsport	6	3	3	3	5	79	**1st**
2018	Lamborghini Super Trofeo Europe - Pro	Konrad Motorsport	12	0	1	0	2	56	6th
2018	Lamborghini Super Trofeo World Final - Pro	Konrad Motorsport	2	0	0	0	0	3	12th
2018	24H GT Series - A6	GP Extreme	1	0	0	0	0	0	NC
2018	Historic Grand Prix of Monaco - Series F	GPX Historic with Token Racing	1	0	0	0	0	N/A	15th
2019	Lamborghini Super Trofeo Middle East - Pro		6	6	1	4	6	0	NC
2019	Lamborghini Super Trofeo Europe - Pro	Konrad Motorsport	4	0	0	0	0	20	10th
2019	Lamborghini Super Trofeo World Final - Pro	Konrad Motorsport	2	0	0	0	0	3	11th
2019	24 Hours of Nürburgring - SP9	Konrad Motorsport	1	0	0	0	0	N/A	DNF
2019	VLN Series - SP9 Pro	Konrad Motorsport	2	0	0	0	0	3.89	86th
2019	VLN Series - SP9 Pro-Am	Konrad Motorsport	3	1	0	0	3	20.75	8th
2019	VLN Series - Cup 3	Overdrive Racing	2	0	0	0	0	10.42	27th
2019	24H GT Series - A6	Toksport WRT	2	0	0	0	1	0	NC
2020	GT World Challenge Europe Sprint Cup	Madpanda Motorsport	10	0	0	0	0	5.5	20th
2020	NLS Series - SP9 Pro	Konrad Motorsport	4	0	0	0	0	3.54	80th
2020	24 Hours of Nürburgring - SP9	Konrad Motorsport	1	0	0	0	0	N/A	DNF
2020	24H GT Series - GT3 Am	Toksport WRT	1	0	0	0	1	26	5th
2021	24H GT Series - GT3	GPX Racing	1	1	0	0	1	29	NC
2021	Asian Le Mans Series - GT	GPX Racing	4	2	0	0	2	62.5	**2nd**
2021	Historic Grand Prix of Monaco - Series F	GPX Historic with Token Racing	1	0	0	0	0	N/A	5th
2021	24 Hours of Nürburgring - SP9	Konrad Motorsport	1	0	0	0	0	N/A	17th
2021	Le Mans Cup - LMP3	Frikadelli Racing Team	4	0	0	0	0	1.5	35th
2021	GT World Challenge Europe Endurance Cup	Toksport WRT	1	0	0	0	0	0	NC
2021	Intercontinental GT Challenge	Toksport WRT	1	0	0	0	0	2	20th
2021	International GT Open - Pro-Am	Kessel Racing	2	0	0	0	0	5	15th
2021	FIA World Endurance Championship - GTE Am	Dempsey-Proton Racing	1	0	0	0	0	0	NC
2022	Asian Le Mans Series - GT	Kessel Racing	4	0	0	0	0	2	15th
2022	International GT Open	Kessel Racing	10	0	0	3	1	27	13th
2022	GT World Challenge Europe Endurance Cup	Al Manar Racing by HRT	5	0	0	0	0	6	31st
2022	Intercontinental GT Challenge	Al Manar Racing by HRT	1	0	0	0	0	0	NC
2022	24H GT Series - GT3	MS7 by WRT							
2022	Prototype Cup Germany	Konrad Motorsport	4	0	1	0	3	82	4th
2022	24 Hours of Nürburgring - SP9	Konrad Motorsport	1	0	0	0	0	N/A	10th
2022	6 Hours of Abu Dhabi	Baron Motorsport	1	1	1	1	1	N/A	**1st**
2022-23	Middle East Trophy - GT3	Al Manar Racing by HRT	1	0	0	0	0	0	NC
2023	Asian Le Mans Series - GT	Herberth Motorsport	4	0	0	0	0	14	10th
2023	FIA World Endurance Championship - GTE Am	Northwest AMR	2	0	0	0	0	0	29th
2023	IMSA SportsCar Championship - GTD	SunEnergy1	1	0	1	0	0	125	68th
2023	International GT Open	racing one	5	0	0	0	0	3	35th
2023	International GT Open	Team Baron Motorsport	2	0	0	0	0	3	35th
2023	International GT Open - Pro-Am	racing one	5	0	0	0	0	0	17th
2023	Prototype Cup Germany	Konrad Motorsport	1	0	0	0	0	3	28th
2023	24 Hours of Nürburgring - SP9	Konrad Motorsport	1	0	0	0	0	N/A	DNF
2023-24	Middle East Trophy - GT3	Baron Motorsport	1	0	0	0	1	36	5th
2023-24	Middle East Trophy - GT3	7TSIX	1	0	0	0	0	36	5th
2024	European Le Mans Series - LMGT3	Iron Lynx	6	1	1	0	4	76	**1st**
2024	Gulf 12 Hours - GT3 Pro-Am	Into Africa Racing by Dragon Racing	1	0	0	0	0	N/A	DNF
2025	Middle East Trophy - GT3	Into Africa Racing by Dragon Racing	2	0	0	0	0	9	12th
2025	International GT Open	Into Africa Racing by Dragon Racing	4	0	0	0	0	0	51st
2025	Nürburgring Langstrecken-Serie - SP9	Realize Kondo Racing with Rinaldi							
2025	GT World Challenge Europe Endurance Cup	Herberth Motorsport	1	0	0	0	0	0	NC
2025	Italian GT Championship Endurance Cup - GT3	HAAS RT	3	0	0	1	1	32	7th
2025	24H Series - GT3	Dragon Racing							
2025	Gulf 12 Hours	Into Africa Racing by HAAS RT	1	0	0	0	0	N/A	14th
2025-26	24H Series Middle East - GT3	Into Africa Racing by Dragon							
2025-26	24H Series Middle East - GT3	AlManar Racing by Dragon							
2026	International GT Open	Into Africa Racing by Dragon	6	0	0	0	0	1	45th
2026	Italian GT Championship Endurance Cup - GT3	Into Africa Racing by Dragon	3	0	0	0	0	5	23rd
2026	Italian GT Championship Sprint Cup - GT3	Audi Sport Italia	5	0	0	0	0	0	NC
2026	ADAC GT Masters	Baron Motorsport	2	0	0	0	0	0	NC†
2026	GT World Challenge Europe Endurance Cup	Lionspeed GP	1	0	0	0	0	NC	0
2026	GT World Challenge Europe Endurance Cup	Rinaldi Racing	1	0	0	0	0	NC	0
2026-27	Asian Le Mans Series - GT3	Dragon Racing						*	*

=== Complete GP2 Series results ===
(key) (Races in bold indicate pole position) (Races in italics indicate fastest lap)

Year	Entrant	1	2	3	4	5	6	7	8	9	10	11	12	13	14	15	16	17	18	19	20	21	22	DC	Points
2014	Trident	BHR; FEA; Ret	BHR; SPR; 21	ESP; FEA	ESP; SPR	MON; FEA	MON; SPR	AUT; FEA	AUT; SPR	GBR; FEA	GBR; SPR	GER; FEA	GER; SPR	HUN; FEA	HUN; SPR	BEL; FEA	BEL; SPR	ITA; FEA	ITA; SPR	RUS; FEA	RUS; SPR	ABU; FEA	ABU; SPR	34th	0

=== Complete Indy Lights results ===
Year	Team	1	2	3	4	5	6	7	8	9	10	11	12	13	14	Rank	Points	Ref
2013	Bryan Herta Autosport	STP	ALA	LBH	INDY	MIL	IOW	POC	TOR	MOH; 7	BAL	HOU; 5	FON			**11th**	**156**	
2014	Belardi Auto Racing	STP	LBH	ALA	ALA	IND	IND	INDY	POC	TOR	MOH; 6	MOH; 4	MIL	SNM	SNM	**14th**	**60**	

=== Complete GT World Challenge Europe results ===
==== GT World Challenge Europe Sprint Cup ====
(key) (Races in bold indicate pole position) (Races in italics indicate fastest lap)

Year	Team	Car	Class	1	2	3	4	5	6	7	8	9	10	Pos.	Points	Ref
2020	Madpanda Motorsport	Mercedes-AMG GT3 Evo	Silver	MIS; 1; 16	MIS; 2; 12	MIS; 3; 9	MAG; 1; 17	MAG; 2; 11	ZAN; 1; 6	ZAN; 2; 15	CAT; 1; 18	CAT; 2; 11	**CAT**; **3**; 13	2nd	72.5	

==== GT World Challenge Europe Endurance Cup ====
(key) (Races in bold indicate pole position) (Races in italics indicate fastest lap)

Year	Team	Car	Class	1	2	3	4	5	6	7	Pos.	Points
2021	Toksport WRT	Mercedes-AMG GT3 Evo	Silver	MNZ	LEC	SPA; 6H; 33	SPA; 12H; 21	SPA; 24H; 13	NÜR	CAT	19th	26
2022	Al Manar Racing by HRT	Mercedes-AMG GT3 Evo	Silver	IMO; 22	LEC; 7	SPA; 6H; Ret	SPA; 12H; Ret	**SPA**; **24H**; Ret	HOC; 13	CAT; 15	4th	66
2025	Herberth Motorsport	Porsche 911 GT3 R (992)	Bronze	LEC	MNZ	SPA; 6H; 32	SPA; 12H; 23	SPA; 24H; 25	NÜR	CAT	19th	23
2026	Lionspeed GP	Porsche 911 GT3 R (992.2)	Bronze	LEC	MNZ	SPA; 6H; 41	SPA; 12H; 27	SPA; 24H; 20	NÜR		14th*	21*
2026	Rinaldi Racing	Ferrari 296 GT3 Evo	Silver							ALG; 41	NC	0

=== Complete FIA World Endurance Championship results ===
(key) (Races in bold indicate pole position) (Races in italics indicate fastest lap)

Year	Entrant	Class	Car	Engine	1	2	3	4	5	6	7	Rank	Points
2021	Team Project 1	LMGTE Am	Porsche 911 RSR-19	Porsche 4.2 L Flat-6	SPA; WD	ALG	MNZ	LMS	BHR			NC	0
2021	Dempsey-Proton Racing	LMGTE Am	Porsche 911 RSR-19	Porsche 4.2 L Flat-6						BHR; Ret		NC	0
2023	Northwest AMR	LMGTE Am	Aston Martin Vantage AMR	Aston Martin 4.0 L Turbo V8	SEB; 11	ALG; 13	SPA	LMS	MNZ	FUJ	BHR	29th	0

=== Complete IMSA SportsCar Championship results ===
(key) (Races in bold indicate pole position; results in italics indicate fastest lap)

Year	Team	Class	Make	Engine	1	2	3	4	5	6	7	8	9	10	11	Pos.	Points	Ref
2023	SunEnergy1	GTD	Mercedes-AMG GT3 Evo	Mercedes-AMG M159 6.2 L V8	**DAY**; 22	SEB	LBH	MON	WGL	MOS	LIM	ELK	VIR	IMS	PET	68th	125	

=== Complete European Le Mans Series results ===
(key) (Races in bold indicate pole position; results in italics indicate fastest lap)

Year	Entrant	Class	Chassis	Engine	1	2	3	4	5	6	Rank	Points
2024	Iron Lynx	LMGT3	Lamborghini Huracán GT3 Evo 2	Lamborghini DGF 5.2 L V10	CAT; 3	LEC; 2	IMO; 3	**SPA**; Ret	MUG; 9	ALG; 1	1st	76

=== Complete ADAC GT Masters results ===
(key) (Races in bold indicate pole position; results in italics indicate fastest lap)

Year	Team	Car	1	2	3	4	5	6	7	8	9	10	11	12	DC	Points
2026	Baron Motorsport	Ferrari 296 GT3	RBR; 1; 7	RBR; 2; 12	ZAN; 1	ZAN; 2	LAU; 1	LAU; 2	NÜR; 1	NÜR; 2	SAL; 1	SAL; 2	HOC; 1	HOC; 2	NC‡	0‡

Sporting positions
Preceded by Alessio Picariello; Zacharie Robichon; Ryan Hardwick (LMGTE)	European Le Mans Series; LMGT3 Champion; 2024; With: Andrea Caldarelli & Hiroshi Hamaguchi	Succeeded by Rui Andrade; Charlie Eastwood; Hiroshi Koizumi
